

527001–527100 

|-bgcolor=#fefefe
| 527001 ||  || — || August 24, 2007 || Kitt Peak || Spacewatch ||  || align=right data-sort-value="0.43" | 430 m || 
|-id=002 bgcolor=#d6d6d6
| 527002 ||  || — || September 5, 2007 || Mount Lemmon || Mount Lemmon Survey ||  || align=right | 2.7 km || 
|-id=003 bgcolor=#fefefe
| 527003 ||  || — || September 13, 2007 || Socorro || LINEAR ||  || align=right data-sort-value="0.73" | 730 m || 
|-id=004 bgcolor=#fefefe
| 527004 ||  || — || September 14, 2007 || Socorro || LINEAR ||  || align=right data-sort-value="0.51" | 510 m || 
|-id=005 bgcolor=#d6d6d6
| 527005 ||  || — || September 12, 2007 || Catalina || CSS ||  || align=right | 2.6 km || 
|-id=006 bgcolor=#fefefe
| 527006 ||  || — || August 24, 2007 || Kitt Peak || Spacewatch ||  || align=right data-sort-value="0.49" | 490 m || 
|-id=007 bgcolor=#d6d6d6
| 527007 ||  || — || September 13, 2007 || Mount Lemmon || Mount Lemmon Survey || THM || align=right | 1.9 km || 
|-id=008 bgcolor=#fefefe
| 527008 ||  || — || September 10, 2007 || Kitt Peak || Spacewatch || NYS || align=right data-sort-value="0.70" | 700 m || 
|-id=009 bgcolor=#d6d6d6
| 527009 ||  || — || August 24, 2007 || Kitt Peak || Spacewatch ||  || align=right | 2.3 km || 
|-id=010 bgcolor=#d6d6d6
| 527010 ||  || — || September 10, 2007 || Kitt Peak || Spacewatch || EOS || align=right | 1.5 km || 
|-id=011 bgcolor=#fefefe
| 527011 ||  || — || September 3, 2007 || Catalina || CSS ||  || align=right data-sort-value="0.55" | 550 m || 
|-id=012 bgcolor=#fefefe
| 527012 ||  || — || September 10, 2007 || Kitt Peak || Spacewatch ||  || align=right data-sort-value="0.45" | 450 m || 
|-id=013 bgcolor=#d6d6d6
| 527013 ||  || — || September 11, 2007 || Catalina || CSS ||  || align=right | 3.1 km || 
|-id=014 bgcolor=#E9E9E9
| 527014 ||  || — || March 8, 2005 || Mount Lemmon || Mount Lemmon Survey ||  || align=right | 1.9 km || 
|-id=015 bgcolor=#d6d6d6
| 527015 ||  || — || September 13, 2007 || Mount Lemmon || Mount Lemmon Survey ||  || align=right | 2.2 km || 
|-id=016 bgcolor=#E9E9E9
| 527016 ||  || — || September 9, 2007 || Kitt Peak || Spacewatch ||  || align=right | 3.2 km || 
|-id=017 bgcolor=#E9E9E9
| 527017 ||  || — || September 9, 2007 || Kitt Peak || Spacewatch || HOF || align=right | 2.4 km || 
|-id=018 bgcolor=#d6d6d6
| 527018 ||  || — || September 10, 2007 || Kitt Peak || Spacewatch ||  || align=right | 2.4 km || 
|-id=019 bgcolor=#d6d6d6
| 527019 ||  || — || September 12, 2007 || Kitt Peak || Spacewatch ||  || align=right | 2.2 km || 
|-id=020 bgcolor=#fefefe
| 527020 ||  || — || September 13, 2007 || Catalina || CSS || NYS || align=right data-sort-value="0.63" | 630 m || 
|-id=021 bgcolor=#d6d6d6
| 527021 ||  || — || September 10, 2007 || Mount Lemmon || Mount Lemmon Survey ||  || align=right | 3.3 km || 
|-id=022 bgcolor=#fefefe
| 527022 ||  || — || September 12, 2007 || Catalina || CSS ||  || align=right data-sort-value="0.78" | 780 m || 
|-id=023 bgcolor=#FA8072
| 527023 ||  || — || September 13, 2007 || Mount Lemmon || Mount Lemmon Survey || H || align=right data-sort-value="0.63" | 630 m || 
|-id=024 bgcolor=#fefefe
| 527024 ||  || — || September 7, 2007 || Socorro || LINEAR ||  || align=right data-sort-value="0.77" | 770 m || 
|-id=025 bgcolor=#d6d6d6
| 527025 ||  || — || September 3, 2007 || Catalina || CSS ||  || align=right | 3.2 km || 
|-id=026 bgcolor=#fefefe
| 527026 ||  || — || August 10, 2007 || Kitt Peak || Spacewatch || NYS || align=right data-sort-value="0.50" | 500 m || 
|-id=027 bgcolor=#d6d6d6
| 527027 ||  || — || September 13, 2007 || Catalina || CSS ||  || align=right | 2.6 km || 
|-id=028 bgcolor=#fefefe
| 527028 ||  || — || September 9, 2007 || Anderson Mesa || LONEOS ||  || align=right data-sort-value="0.68" | 680 m || 
|-id=029 bgcolor=#d6d6d6
| 527029 ||  || — || September 14, 2007 || Kitt Peak || Spacewatch ||  || align=right | 2.7 km || 
|-id=030 bgcolor=#E9E9E9
| 527030 ||  || — || September 15, 2007 || Mount Lemmon || Mount Lemmon Survey ||  || align=right | 1.5 km || 
|-id=031 bgcolor=#d6d6d6
| 527031 ||  || — || September 15, 2007 || Mount Lemmon || Mount Lemmon Survey ||  || align=right | 3.2 km || 
|-id=032 bgcolor=#fefefe
| 527032 ||  || — || September 15, 2007 || Mount Lemmon || Mount Lemmon Survey ||  || align=right data-sort-value="0.59" | 590 m || 
|-id=033 bgcolor=#d6d6d6
| 527033 ||  || — || September 15, 2007 || Kitt Peak || Spacewatch ||  || align=right | 2.4 km || 
|-id=034 bgcolor=#fefefe
| 527034 ||  || — || September 15, 2007 || Kitt Peak || Spacewatch ||  || align=right data-sort-value="0.62" | 620 m || 
|-id=035 bgcolor=#d6d6d6
| 527035 ||  || — || September 13, 2007 || Catalina || CSS ||  || align=right | 2.9 km || 
|-id=036 bgcolor=#d6d6d6
| 527036 ||  || — || September 11, 2007 || Mount Lemmon || Mount Lemmon Survey ||  || align=right | 2.1 km || 
|-id=037 bgcolor=#d6d6d6
| 527037 ||  || — || September 9, 2007 || Mount Lemmon || Mount Lemmon Survey || THM || align=right | 2.3 km || 
|-id=038 bgcolor=#d6d6d6
| 527038 ||  || — || September 14, 2007 || Mount Lemmon || Mount Lemmon Survey ||  || align=right | 2.5 km || 
|-id=039 bgcolor=#d6d6d6
| 527039 ||  || — || September 14, 2007 || Mount Lemmon || Mount Lemmon Survey || THM || align=right | 2.2 km || 
|-id=040 bgcolor=#d6d6d6
| 527040 ||  || — || September 10, 2007 || Kitt Peak || Spacewatch ||  || align=right | 2.3 km || 
|-id=041 bgcolor=#fefefe
| 527041 ||  || — || September 2, 2007 || Siding Spring || K. Sárneczky, L. Kiss ||  || align=right data-sort-value="0.53" | 530 m || 
|-id=042 bgcolor=#d6d6d6
| 527042 ||  || — || September 12, 2007 || Mount Lemmon || Mount Lemmon Survey ||  || align=right | 2.0 km || 
|-id=043 bgcolor=#fefefe
| 527043 ||  || — || September 13, 2007 || Mount Lemmon || Mount Lemmon Survey || (2076) || align=right data-sort-value="0.76" | 760 m || 
|-id=044 bgcolor=#d6d6d6
| 527044 ||  || — || September 14, 2007 || Mount Lemmon || Mount Lemmon Survey ||  || align=right | 2.5 km || 
|-id=045 bgcolor=#d6d6d6
| 527045 ||  || — || September 15, 2007 || Kitt Peak || Spacewatch ||  || align=right | 2.0 km || 
|-id=046 bgcolor=#d6d6d6
| 527046 ||  || — || September 14, 2007 || Mount Lemmon || Mount Lemmon Survey ||  || align=right | 2.3 km || 
|-id=047 bgcolor=#fefefe
| 527047 ||  || — || September 13, 2007 || Mount Lemmon || Mount Lemmon Survey || MAS || align=right data-sort-value="0.43" | 430 m || 
|-id=048 bgcolor=#d6d6d6
| 527048 ||  || — || September 14, 2007 || Mount Lemmon || Mount Lemmon Survey ||  || align=right | 1.9 km || 
|-id=049 bgcolor=#d6d6d6
| 527049 ||  || — || September 14, 2007 || Mount Lemmon || Mount Lemmon Survey || EOS || align=right | 1.7 km || 
|-id=050 bgcolor=#E9E9E9
| 527050 ||  || — || September 14, 2007 || Mount Lemmon || Mount Lemmon Survey ||  || align=right | 1.7 km || 
|-id=051 bgcolor=#d6d6d6
| 527051 ||  || — || September 14, 2007 || Mount Lemmon || Mount Lemmon Survey ||  || align=right | 2.5 km || 
|-id=052 bgcolor=#E9E9E9
| 527052 ||  || — || September 4, 2007 || Mount Lemmon || Mount Lemmon Survey ||  || align=right | 1.9 km || 
|-id=053 bgcolor=#fefefe
| 527053 ||  || — || September 14, 2007 || Catalina || CSS || H || align=right data-sort-value="0.67" | 670 m || 
|-id=054 bgcolor=#d6d6d6
| 527054 ||  || — || September 13, 2007 || Mount Lemmon || Mount Lemmon Survey ||  || align=right | 2.4 km || 
|-id=055 bgcolor=#d6d6d6
| 527055 ||  || — || June 21, 2007 || Mount Lemmon || Mount Lemmon Survey ||  || align=right | 2.4 km || 
|-id=056 bgcolor=#fefefe
| 527056 ||  || — || September 10, 2007 || Catalina || CSS || H || align=right data-sort-value="0.71" | 710 m || 
|-id=057 bgcolor=#d6d6d6
| 527057 ||  || — || September 15, 2007 || Catalina || CSS ||  || align=right | 2.8 km || 
|-id=058 bgcolor=#fefefe
| 527058 ||  || — || September 5, 2007 || Catalina || CSS ||  || align=right data-sort-value="0.75" | 750 m || 
|-id=059 bgcolor=#d6d6d6
| 527059 ||  || — || September 12, 2007 || Catalina || CSS ||  || align=right | 2.6 km || 
|-id=060 bgcolor=#fefefe
| 527060 ||  || — || September 9, 2007 || Kitt Peak || Spacewatch ||  || align=right data-sort-value="0.70" | 700 m || 
|-id=061 bgcolor=#d6d6d6
| 527061 ||  || — || September 9, 2007 || Mount Lemmon || Mount Lemmon Survey ||  || align=right | 2.5 km || 
|-id=062 bgcolor=#d6d6d6
| 527062 ||  || — || September 11, 2007 || Kitt Peak || Spacewatch ||  || align=right | 3.4 km || 
|-id=063 bgcolor=#d6d6d6
| 527063 ||  || — || September 12, 2007 || Mount Lemmon || Mount Lemmon Survey ||  || align=right | 2.0 km || 
|-id=064 bgcolor=#d6d6d6
| 527064 ||  || — || September 14, 2007 || Mount Lemmon || Mount Lemmon Survey ||  || align=right | 2.5 km || 
|-id=065 bgcolor=#E9E9E9
| 527065 ||  || — || September 12, 2007 || Mount Lemmon || Mount Lemmon Survey ||  || align=right | 1.6 km || 
|-id=066 bgcolor=#d6d6d6
| 527066 ||  || — || September 12, 2007 || Mount Lemmon || Mount Lemmon Survey ||  || align=right | 2.5 km || 
|-id=067 bgcolor=#d6d6d6
| 527067 ||  || — || September 7, 1996 || Kitt Peak || Spacewatch ||  || align=right | 2.4 km || 
|-id=068 bgcolor=#fefefe
| 527068 ||  || — || September 13, 2007 || Mount Lemmon || Mount Lemmon Survey ||  || align=right data-sort-value="0.52" | 520 m || 
|-id=069 bgcolor=#d6d6d6
| 527069 ||  || — || September 15, 2007 || Mount Lemmon || Mount Lemmon Survey ||  || align=right | 2.4 km || 
|-id=070 bgcolor=#E9E9E9
| 527070 ||  || — || September 13, 2007 || Mount Lemmon || Mount Lemmon Survey ||  || align=right | 1.9 km || 
|-id=071 bgcolor=#E9E9E9
| 527071 ||  || — || September 11, 2007 || Mount Lemmon || Mount Lemmon Survey ||  || align=right | 1.3 km || 
|-id=072 bgcolor=#E9E9E9
| 527072 ||  || — || August 10, 2007 || Kitt Peak || Spacewatch ||  || align=right | 1.2 km || 
|-id=073 bgcolor=#d6d6d6
| 527073 ||  || — || September 13, 2007 || Kitt Peak || Spacewatch ||  || align=right | 2.2 km || 
|-id=074 bgcolor=#fefefe
| 527074 ||  || — || September 14, 2007 || Mount Lemmon || Mount Lemmon Survey ||  || align=right data-sort-value="0.57" | 570 m || 
|-id=075 bgcolor=#E9E9E9
| 527075 ||  || — || January 21, 2004 || Socorro || LINEAR ||  || align=right | 2.3 km || 
|-id=076 bgcolor=#fefefe
| 527076 ||  || — || September 11, 2007 || Kitt Peak || Spacewatch ||  || align=right data-sort-value="0.56" | 560 m || 
|-id=077 bgcolor=#fefefe
| 527077 ||  || — || April 4, 2003 || Kitt Peak || Spacewatch ||  || align=right data-sort-value="0.63" | 630 m || 
|-id=078 bgcolor=#fefefe
| 527078 ||  || — || September 3, 2007 || Catalina || CSS ||  || align=right data-sort-value="0.62" | 620 m || 
|-id=079 bgcolor=#fefefe
| 527079 ||  || — || September 8, 2007 || Mount Lemmon || Mount Lemmon Survey ||  || align=right data-sort-value="0.65" | 650 m || 
|-id=080 bgcolor=#E9E9E9
| 527080 ||  || — || September 10, 2007 || Mount Lemmon || Mount Lemmon Survey ||  || align=right | 2.1 km || 
|-id=081 bgcolor=#fefefe
| 527081 ||  || — || August 12, 2007 || XuYi || PMO NEO || H || align=right data-sort-value="0.69" | 690 m || 
|-id=082 bgcolor=#fefefe
| 527082 ||  || — || September 12, 2007 || Catalina || CSS ||  || align=right data-sort-value="0.64" | 640 m || 
|-id=083 bgcolor=#fefefe
| 527083 ||  || — || September 12, 2007 || Mount Lemmon || Mount Lemmon Survey ||  || align=right data-sort-value="0.54" | 540 m || 
|-id=084 bgcolor=#fefefe
| 527084 ||  || — || September 12, 2007 || Mount Lemmon || Mount Lemmon Survey ||  || align=right data-sort-value="0.60" | 600 m || 
|-id=085 bgcolor=#fefefe
| 527085 ||  || — || September 12, 2007 || Mount Lemmon || Mount Lemmon Survey ||  || align=right data-sort-value="0.59" | 590 m || 
|-id=086 bgcolor=#d6d6d6
| 527086 ||  || — || September 12, 2007 || Mount Lemmon || Mount Lemmon Survey ||  || align=right | 2.1 km || 
|-id=087 bgcolor=#d6d6d6
| 527087 ||  || — || September 13, 2007 || Catalina || CSS ||  || align=right | 2.4 km || 
|-id=088 bgcolor=#fefefe
| 527088 ||  || — || September 13, 2007 || Catalina || CSS ||  || align=right data-sort-value="0.64" | 640 m || 
|-id=089 bgcolor=#d6d6d6
| 527089 ||  || — || September 14, 2007 || Mount Lemmon || Mount Lemmon Survey ||  || align=right | 1.9 km || 
|-id=090 bgcolor=#fefefe
| 527090 ||  || — || September 14, 2007 || Mount Lemmon || Mount Lemmon Survey ||  || align=right data-sort-value="0.54" | 540 m || 
|-id=091 bgcolor=#fefefe
| 527091 ||  || — || September 14, 2007 || Catalina || CSS ||  || align=right data-sort-value="0.68" | 680 m || 
|-id=092 bgcolor=#fefefe
| 527092 ||  || — || September 14, 2007 || Mount Lemmon || Mount Lemmon Survey ||  || align=right data-sort-value="0.54" | 540 m || 
|-id=093 bgcolor=#d6d6d6
| 527093 ||  || — || September 14, 2007 || Mount Lemmon || Mount Lemmon Survey ||  || align=right | 2.1 km || 
|-id=094 bgcolor=#fefefe
| 527094 ||  || — || September 12, 2007 || Catalina || CSS ||  || align=right | 1.0 km || 
|-id=095 bgcolor=#fefefe
| 527095 ||  || — || September 9, 2007 || Anderson Mesa || LONEOS ||  || align=right data-sort-value="0.90" | 900 m || 
|-id=096 bgcolor=#d6d6d6
| 527096 ||  || — || September 16, 2007 || Socorro || LINEAR || Tj (2.97) || align=right | 3.3 km || 
|-id=097 bgcolor=#fefefe
| 527097 ||  || — || September 18, 2007 || Kitt Peak || Spacewatch ||  || align=right data-sort-value="0.61" | 610 m || 
|-id=098 bgcolor=#fefefe
| 527098 ||  || — || September 18, 2007 || Kitt Peak || Spacewatch ||  || align=right data-sort-value="0.59" | 590 m || 
|-id=099 bgcolor=#fefefe
| 527099 ||  || — || September 19, 2007 || Kitt Peak || Spacewatch || H || align=right data-sort-value="0.60" | 600 m || 
|-id=100 bgcolor=#fefefe
| 527100 ||  || — || July 18, 2007 || Mount Lemmon || Mount Lemmon Survey ||  || align=right data-sort-value="0.74" | 740 m || 
|}

527101–527200 

|-bgcolor=#d6d6d6
| 527101 ||  || — || September 30, 2007 || Kitt Peak || Spacewatch ||  || align=right | 2.8 km || 
|-id=102 bgcolor=#d6d6d6
| 527102 ||  || — || September 30, 2007 || Kitt Peak || Spacewatch ||  || align=right | 2.5 km || 
|-id=103 bgcolor=#d6d6d6
| 527103 ||  || — || September 20, 2007 || Catalina || CSS ||  || align=right | 3.2 km || 
|-id=104 bgcolor=#fefefe
| 527104 ||  || — || September 21, 2007 || XuYi || PMO NEO ||  || align=right data-sort-value="0.73" | 730 m || 
|-id=105 bgcolor=#fefefe
| 527105 ||  || — || September 25, 2007 || Mount Lemmon || Mount Lemmon Survey ||  || align=right data-sort-value="0.78" | 780 m || 
|-id=106 bgcolor=#d6d6d6
| 527106 ||  || — || September 20, 2007 || Kitt Peak || Spacewatch ||  || align=right | 2.1 km || 
|-id=107 bgcolor=#d6d6d6
| 527107 ||  || — || September 19, 2007 || Kitt Peak || Spacewatch ||  || align=right | 2.4 km || 
|-id=108 bgcolor=#d6d6d6
| 527108 ||  || — || September 25, 2007 || Mount Lemmon || Mount Lemmon Survey ||  || align=right | 2.4 km || 
|-id=109 bgcolor=#fefefe
| 527109 ||  || — || September 18, 2007 || Mount Lemmon || Mount Lemmon Survey ||  || align=right data-sort-value="0.57" | 570 m || 
|-id=110 bgcolor=#E9E9E9
| 527110 ||  || — || September 19, 2007 || Kitt Peak || Spacewatch ||  || align=right | 1.6 km || 
|-id=111 bgcolor=#d6d6d6
| 527111 ||  || — || October 3, 2007 || Kitt Peak || Spacewatch ||  || align=right | 2.6 km || 
|-id=112 bgcolor=#d6d6d6
| 527112 ||  || — || October 6, 2007 || La Sagra || OAM Obs. ||  || align=right | 3.4 km || 
|-id=113 bgcolor=#fefefe
| 527113 ||  || — || October 6, 2007 || Socorro || LINEAR ||  || align=right | 1.0 km || 
|-id=114 bgcolor=#fefefe
| 527114 ||  || — || October 6, 2007 || Socorro || LINEAR || H || align=right data-sort-value="0.69" | 690 m || 
|-id=115 bgcolor=#FFC2E0
| 527115 ||  || — || October 8, 2007 || Mount Lemmon || Mount Lemmon Survey || AMO || align=right data-sort-value="0.59" | 590 m || 
|-id=116 bgcolor=#d6d6d6
| 527116 ||  || — || October 9, 2007 || Altschwendt || W. Ries ||  || align=right | 2.0 km || 
|-id=117 bgcolor=#E9E9E9
| 527117 ||  || — || September 5, 2007 || Catalina || CSS ||  || align=right | 1.4 km || 
|-id=118 bgcolor=#d6d6d6
| 527118 ||  || — || October 4, 2007 || Catalina || CSS ||  || align=right | 5.0 km || 
|-id=119 bgcolor=#E9E9E9
| 527119 ||  || — || September 20, 2007 || Kitt Peak || Spacewatch ||  || align=right | 1.7 km || 
|-id=120 bgcolor=#d6d6d6
| 527120 ||  || — || October 4, 2007 || Kitt Peak || Spacewatch || THM || align=right | 2.2 km || 
|-id=121 bgcolor=#d6d6d6
| 527121 ||  || — || October 4, 2007 || Kitt Peak || Spacewatch ||  || align=right | 3.1 km || 
|-id=122 bgcolor=#E9E9E9
| 527122 ||  || — || October 4, 2007 || Kitt Peak || Spacewatch ||  || align=right | 2.0 km || 
|-id=123 bgcolor=#fefefe
| 527123 ||  || — || October 4, 2007 || Kitt Peak || Spacewatch ||  || align=right data-sort-value="0.69" | 690 m || 
|-id=124 bgcolor=#d6d6d6
| 527124 ||  || — || October 6, 2007 || Kitt Peak || Spacewatch ||  || align=right | 2.7 km || 
|-id=125 bgcolor=#fefefe
| 527125 ||  || — || October 6, 2007 || Kitt Peak || Spacewatch || MAS || align=right data-sort-value="0.65" | 650 m || 
|-id=126 bgcolor=#fefefe
| 527126 ||  || — || September 15, 2007 || Mount Lemmon || Mount Lemmon Survey || MAS || align=right data-sort-value="0.73" | 730 m || 
|-id=127 bgcolor=#fefefe
| 527127 ||  || — || September 12, 2007 || Mount Lemmon || Mount Lemmon Survey ||  || align=right data-sort-value="0.66" | 660 m || 
|-id=128 bgcolor=#d6d6d6
| 527128 ||  || — || September 25, 2006 || Mount Lemmon || Mount Lemmon Survey || 3:2 || align=right | 4.5 km || 
|-id=129 bgcolor=#E9E9E9
| 527129 ||  || — || October 7, 2007 || Catalina || CSS ||  || align=right | 1.6 km || 
|-id=130 bgcolor=#E9E9E9
| 527130 ||  || — || September 14, 2007 || Mount Lemmon || Mount Lemmon Survey ||  || align=right | 2.2 km || 
|-id=131 bgcolor=#fefefe
| 527131 ||  || — || October 4, 2007 || Kitt Peak || Spacewatch ||  || align=right data-sort-value="0.68" | 680 m || 
|-id=132 bgcolor=#fefefe
| 527132 ||  || — || October 4, 2007 || Kitt Peak || Spacewatch ||  || align=right data-sort-value="0.68" | 680 m || 
|-id=133 bgcolor=#fefefe
| 527133 ||  || — || October 4, 2007 || Kitt Peak || Spacewatch ||  || align=right data-sort-value="0.67" | 670 m || 
|-id=134 bgcolor=#fefefe
| 527134 ||  || — || October 4, 2007 || Kitt Peak || Spacewatch || MAS || align=right data-sort-value="0.49" | 490 m || 
|-id=135 bgcolor=#d6d6d6
| 527135 ||  || — || October 4, 2007 || Kitt Peak || Spacewatch ||  || align=right | 1.9 km || 
|-id=136 bgcolor=#fefefe
| 527136 ||  || — || October 4, 2007 || Kitt Peak || Spacewatch ||  || align=right data-sort-value="0.78" | 780 m || 
|-id=137 bgcolor=#d6d6d6
| 527137 ||  || — || October 4, 2007 || Kitt Peak || Spacewatch ||  || align=right | 2.1 km || 
|-id=138 bgcolor=#E9E9E9
| 527138 ||  || — || August 24, 2007 || Kitt Peak || Spacewatch ||  || align=right | 1.4 km || 
|-id=139 bgcolor=#d6d6d6
| 527139 ||  || — || October 6, 2007 || Socorro || LINEAR ||  || align=right | 3.3 km || 
|-id=140 bgcolor=#fefefe
| 527140 ||  || — || September 8, 2007 || Mount Lemmon || Mount Lemmon Survey ||  || align=right data-sort-value="0.65" | 650 m || 
|-id=141 bgcolor=#FA8072
| 527141 ||  || — || October 7, 2007 || Mount Lemmon || Mount Lemmon Survey ||  || align=right data-sort-value="0.69" | 690 m || 
|-id=142 bgcolor=#fefefe
| 527142 ||  || — || October 7, 2007 || Mount Lemmon || Mount Lemmon Survey || NYS || align=right data-sort-value="0.48" | 480 m || 
|-id=143 bgcolor=#d6d6d6
| 527143 ||  || — || September 14, 2007 || Mount Lemmon || Mount Lemmon Survey ||  || align=right | 2.6 km || 
|-id=144 bgcolor=#fefefe
| 527144 ||  || — || October 5, 2007 || Kitt Peak || Spacewatch || NYS || align=right data-sort-value="0.48" | 480 m || 
|-id=145 bgcolor=#fefefe
| 527145 ||  || — || October 5, 2007 || Kitt Peak || Spacewatch ||  || align=right data-sort-value="0.90" | 900 m || 
|-id=146 bgcolor=#fefefe
| 527146 ||  || — || October 5, 2007 || Kitt Peak || Spacewatch ||  || align=right data-sort-value="0.61" | 610 m || 
|-id=147 bgcolor=#d6d6d6
| 527147 ||  || — || October 5, 2007 || Kitt Peak || Spacewatch ||  || align=right | 2.8 km || 
|-id=148 bgcolor=#fefefe
| 527148 ||  || — || September 25, 2007 || Mount Lemmon || Mount Lemmon Survey ||  || align=right data-sort-value="0.78" | 780 m || 
|-id=149 bgcolor=#d6d6d6
| 527149 ||  || — || October 5, 2007 || Kitt Peak || Spacewatch ||  || align=right | 2.5 km || 
|-id=150 bgcolor=#fefefe
| 527150 ||  || — || October 5, 2007 || Kitt Peak || Spacewatch ||  || align=right data-sort-value="0.67" | 670 m || 
|-id=151 bgcolor=#d6d6d6
| 527151 ||  || — || October 7, 2007 || Mount Lemmon || Mount Lemmon Survey ||  || align=right | 1.7 km || 
|-id=152 bgcolor=#d6d6d6
| 527152 ||  || — || October 8, 2007 || Catalina || CSS ||  || align=right | 5.8 km || 
|-id=153 bgcolor=#d6d6d6
| 527153 ||  || — || October 8, 2007 || Mount Lemmon || Mount Lemmon Survey ||  || align=right | 2.9 km || 
|-id=154 bgcolor=#fefefe
| 527154 ||  || — || September 14, 2007 || Mount Lemmon || Mount Lemmon Survey ||  || align=right data-sort-value="0.86" | 860 m || 
|-id=155 bgcolor=#d6d6d6
| 527155 ||  || — || October 8, 2007 || Mount Lemmon || Mount Lemmon Survey ||  || align=right | 2.6 km || 
|-id=156 bgcolor=#fefefe
| 527156 ||  || — || October 8, 2007 || Mount Lemmon || Mount Lemmon Survey ||  || align=right data-sort-value="0.60" | 600 m || 
|-id=157 bgcolor=#d6d6d6
| 527157 ||  || — || September 11, 2007 || Mount Lemmon || Mount Lemmon Survey ||  || align=right | 2.0 km || 
|-id=158 bgcolor=#d6d6d6
| 527158 ||  || — || October 5, 2007 || Kitt Peak || Spacewatch ||  || align=right | 2.1 km || 
|-id=159 bgcolor=#fefefe
| 527159 ||  || — || September 20, 2007 || Kitt Peak || Spacewatch || NYS || align=right data-sort-value="0.44" | 440 m || 
|-id=160 bgcolor=#d6d6d6
| 527160 ||  || — || October 8, 2007 || Mount Lemmon || Mount Lemmon Survey ||  || align=right | 2.8 km || 
|-id=161 bgcolor=#d6d6d6
| 527161 ||  || — || October 8, 2007 || Mount Lemmon || Mount Lemmon Survey ||  || align=right | 1.8 km || 
|-id=162 bgcolor=#fefefe
| 527162 ||  || — || October 8, 2007 || Mount Lemmon || Mount Lemmon Survey || NYS || align=right data-sort-value="0.46" | 460 m || 
|-id=163 bgcolor=#d6d6d6
| 527163 ||  || — || September 13, 2007 || Mount Lemmon || Mount Lemmon Survey ||  || align=right | 2.4 km || 
|-id=164 bgcolor=#fefefe
| 527164 ||  || — || August 13, 2007 || XuYi || PMO NEO ||  || align=right data-sort-value="0.73" | 730 m || 
|-id=165 bgcolor=#d6d6d6
| 527165 ||  || — || April 11, 2005 || Kitt Peak || Spacewatch ||  || align=right | 3.6 km || 
|-id=166 bgcolor=#E9E9E9
| 527166 ||  || — || October 7, 2007 || Catalina || CSS ||  || align=right | 1.5 km || 
|-id=167 bgcolor=#fefefe
| 527167 ||  || — || October 8, 2007 || Catalina || CSS ||  || align=right data-sort-value="0.69" | 690 m || 
|-id=168 bgcolor=#fefefe
| 527168 ||  || — || October 8, 1993 || Kitt Peak || Spacewatch ||  || align=right data-sort-value="0.64" | 640 m || 
|-id=169 bgcolor=#d6d6d6
| 527169 ||  || — || October 8, 2007 || Mount Lemmon || Mount Lemmon Survey ||  || align=right | 2.3 km || 
|-id=170 bgcolor=#d6d6d6
| 527170 ||  || — || October 9, 2007 || Anderson Mesa || LONEOS ||  || align=right | 2.5 km || 
|-id=171 bgcolor=#d6d6d6
| 527171 ||  || — || October 9, 2007 || Kitt Peak || Spacewatch ||  || align=right | 1.8 km || 
|-id=172 bgcolor=#d6d6d6
| 527172 ||  || — || October 6, 2007 || Kitt Peak || Spacewatch ||  || align=right | 2.4 km || 
|-id=173 bgcolor=#fefefe
| 527173 ||  || — || September 15, 2007 || Mount Lemmon || Mount Lemmon Survey || NYS || align=right data-sort-value="0.50" | 500 m || 
|-id=174 bgcolor=#fefefe
| 527174 ||  || — || October 6, 2007 || Kitt Peak || Spacewatch ||  || align=right data-sort-value="0.76" | 760 m || 
|-id=175 bgcolor=#d6d6d6
| 527175 ||  || — || June 23, 1995 || Kitt Peak || Spacewatch ||  || align=right | 2.7 km || 
|-id=176 bgcolor=#fefefe
| 527176 ||  || — || October 6, 2007 || Kitt Peak || Spacewatch ||  || align=right data-sort-value="0.64" | 640 m || 
|-id=177 bgcolor=#fefefe
| 527177 ||  || — || September 13, 2007 || Mount Lemmon || Mount Lemmon Survey ||  || align=right data-sort-value="0.62" | 620 m || 
|-id=178 bgcolor=#d6d6d6
| 527178 ||  || — || October 6, 2007 || Kitt Peak || Spacewatch ||  || align=right | 2.6 km || 
|-id=179 bgcolor=#fefefe
| 527179 ||  || — || October 6, 2007 || Kitt Peak || Spacewatch ||  || align=right data-sort-value="0.52" | 520 m || 
|-id=180 bgcolor=#fefefe
| 527180 ||  || — || September 15, 2007 || Mount Lemmon || Mount Lemmon Survey || MAS || align=right data-sort-value="0.57" | 570 m || 
|-id=181 bgcolor=#d6d6d6
| 527181 ||  || — || October 7, 2007 || Mount Lemmon || Mount Lemmon Survey ||  || align=right | 2.7 km || 
|-id=182 bgcolor=#d6d6d6
| 527182 ||  || — || October 7, 2007 || Mount Lemmon || Mount Lemmon Survey || THM || align=right | 1.9 km || 
|-id=183 bgcolor=#d6d6d6
| 527183 ||  || — || October 7, 2007 || Mount Lemmon || Mount Lemmon Survey || EUP || align=right | 3.1 km || 
|-id=184 bgcolor=#d6d6d6
| 527184 ||  || — || October 7, 2007 || Mount Lemmon || Mount Lemmon Survey ||  || align=right | 2.1 km || 
|-id=185 bgcolor=#E9E9E9
| 527185 ||  || — || September 12, 2007 || Catalina || CSS ||  || align=right | 1.5 km || 
|-id=186 bgcolor=#E9E9E9
| 527186 ||  || — || September 30, 2007 || Kitt Peak || Spacewatch ||  || align=right | 1.6 km || 
|-id=187 bgcolor=#d6d6d6
| 527187 ||  || — || October 9, 2007 || Catalina || CSS ||  || align=right | 2.4 km || 
|-id=188 bgcolor=#FA8072
| 527188 ||  || — || October 9, 2007 || Catalina || CSS ||  || align=right | 1.7 km || 
|-id=189 bgcolor=#fefefe
| 527189 ||  || — || October 9, 2007 || Mount Lemmon || Mount Lemmon Survey || MAS || align=right data-sort-value="0.59" | 590 m || 
|-id=190 bgcolor=#FA8072
| 527190 ||  || — || October 9, 2007 || Socorro || LINEAR || H || align=right data-sort-value="0.71" | 710 m || 
|-id=191 bgcolor=#E9E9E9
| 527191 ||  || — || October 7, 2007 || Catalina || CSS ||  || align=right | 1.4 km || 
|-id=192 bgcolor=#d6d6d6
| 527192 ||  || — || September 5, 2007 || Mount Lemmon || Mount Lemmon Survey ||  || align=right | 2.7 km || 
|-id=193 bgcolor=#d6d6d6
| 527193 ||  || — || October 11, 2007 || Catalina || CSS ||  || align=right | 2.9 km || 
|-id=194 bgcolor=#d6d6d6
| 527194 ||  || — || October 8, 2007 || Mount Lemmon || Mount Lemmon Survey ||  || align=right | 2.3 km || 
|-id=195 bgcolor=#d6d6d6
| 527195 ||  || — || September 11, 2007 || Mount Lemmon || Mount Lemmon Survey || BRA || align=right | 1.6 km || 
|-id=196 bgcolor=#d6d6d6
| 527196 ||  || — || October 9, 2007 || Kitt Peak || Spacewatch ||  || align=right | 2.9 km || 
|-id=197 bgcolor=#d6d6d6
| 527197 ||  || — || October 11, 2007 || Socorro || LINEAR ||  || align=right | 2.7 km || 
|-id=198 bgcolor=#fefefe
| 527198 ||  || — || October 4, 2007 || Kitt Peak || Spacewatch ||  || align=right data-sort-value="0.62" | 620 m || 
|-id=199 bgcolor=#fefefe
| 527199 ||  || — || September 14, 2007 || Mount Lemmon || Mount Lemmon Survey || MAS || align=right data-sort-value="0.67" | 670 m || 
|-id=200 bgcolor=#d6d6d6
| 527200 ||  || — || October 12, 2007 || Socorro || LINEAR ||  || align=right | 2.7 km || 
|}

527201–527300 

|-bgcolor=#fefefe
| 527201 ||  || — || September 13, 2007 || Kitt Peak || Spacewatch ||  || align=right data-sort-value="0.60" | 600 m || 
|-id=202 bgcolor=#fefefe
| 527202 ||  || — || September 13, 2007 || Mount Lemmon || Mount Lemmon Survey ||  || align=right data-sort-value="0.53" | 530 m || 
|-id=203 bgcolor=#fefefe
| 527203 ||  || — || October 5, 2007 || Kitt Peak || Spacewatch || H || align=right data-sort-value="0.78" | 780 m || 
|-id=204 bgcolor=#d6d6d6
| 527204 ||  || — || October 6, 2007 || Kitt Peak || Spacewatch ||  || align=right | 3.3 km || 
|-id=205 bgcolor=#fefefe
| 527205 ||  || — || October 6, 2007 || XuYi || PMO NEO ||  || align=right data-sort-value="0.80" | 800 m || 
|-id=206 bgcolor=#fefefe
| 527206 ||  || — || October 7, 2007 || Kitt Peak || Spacewatch ||  || align=right data-sort-value="0.75" | 750 m || 
|-id=207 bgcolor=#fefefe
| 527207 ||  || — || October 9, 2007 || Kitt Peak || Spacewatch || ERI || align=right | 1.2 km || 
|-id=208 bgcolor=#fefefe
| 527208 ||  || — || September 13, 2007 || Mount Lemmon || Mount Lemmon Survey || MAS || align=right data-sort-value="0.68" | 680 m || 
|-id=209 bgcolor=#d6d6d6
| 527209 ||  || — || October 4, 2007 || Catalina || CSS ||  || align=right | 2.7 km || 
|-id=210 bgcolor=#fefefe
| 527210 ||  || — || September 8, 2007 || Mount Lemmon || Mount Lemmon Survey || MAS || align=right data-sort-value="0.52" | 520 m || 
|-id=211 bgcolor=#d6d6d6
| 527211 ||  || — || October 8, 2007 || Kitt Peak || Spacewatch || THM || align=right | 1.7 km || 
|-id=212 bgcolor=#fefefe
| 527212 ||  || — || October 8, 2007 || Kitt Peak || Spacewatch ||  || align=right data-sort-value="0.60" | 600 m || 
|-id=213 bgcolor=#d6d6d6
| 527213 ||  || — || October 8, 2007 || Kitt Peak || Spacewatch ||  || align=right | 2.3 km || 
|-id=214 bgcolor=#d6d6d6
| 527214 ||  || — || October 8, 2007 || Mount Lemmon || Mount Lemmon Survey ||  || align=right | 2.1 km || 
|-id=215 bgcolor=#fefefe
| 527215 ||  || — || October 8, 2007 || Mount Lemmon || Mount Lemmon Survey ||  || align=right data-sort-value="0.68" | 680 m || 
|-id=216 bgcolor=#d6d6d6
| 527216 ||  || — || October 10, 2007 || Catalina || CSS ||  || align=right | 2.7 km || 
|-id=217 bgcolor=#d6d6d6
| 527217 ||  || — || October 5, 2007 || Kitt Peak || Spacewatch ||  || align=right | 2.9 km || 
|-id=218 bgcolor=#d6d6d6
| 527218 ||  || — || September 25, 2007 || Mount Lemmon || Mount Lemmon Survey ||  || align=right | 1.8 km || 
|-id=219 bgcolor=#d6d6d6
| 527219 ||  || — || October 7, 2007 || Kitt Peak || Spacewatch ||  || align=right | 2.8 km || 
|-id=220 bgcolor=#fefefe
| 527220 ||  || — || October 7, 2007 || Kitt Peak || Spacewatch || V || align=right data-sort-value="0.54" | 540 m || 
|-id=221 bgcolor=#d6d6d6
| 527221 ||  || — || October 7, 2007 || Catalina || CSS ||  || align=right | 3.6 km || 
|-id=222 bgcolor=#fefefe
| 527222 ||  || — || October 7, 2007 || Kitt Peak || Spacewatch ||  || align=right data-sort-value="0.59" | 590 m || 
|-id=223 bgcolor=#d6d6d6
| 527223 ||  || — || October 7, 2007 || Kitt Peak || Spacewatch || EOS || align=right | 1.7 km || 
|-id=224 bgcolor=#fefefe
| 527224 ||  || — || October 7, 2007 || Kitt Peak || Spacewatch ||  || align=right data-sort-value="0.68" | 680 m || 
|-id=225 bgcolor=#d6d6d6
| 527225 ||  || — || October 7, 2007 || Kitt Peak || Spacewatch ||  || align=right | 2.9 km || 
|-id=226 bgcolor=#fefefe
| 527226 ||  || — || October 4, 2007 || Kitt Peak || Spacewatch ||  || align=right data-sort-value="0.62" | 620 m || 
|-id=227 bgcolor=#d6d6d6
| 527227 ||  || — || September 15, 2007 || Mount Lemmon || Mount Lemmon Survey ||  || align=right | 2.3 km || 
|-id=228 bgcolor=#d6d6d6
| 527228 ||  || — || September 14, 2007 || Mount Lemmon || Mount Lemmon Survey ||  || align=right | 1.8 km || 
|-id=229 bgcolor=#fefefe
| 527229 ||  || — || October 9, 2007 || Mount Lemmon || Mount Lemmon Survey ||  || align=right data-sort-value="0.62" | 620 m || 
|-id=230 bgcolor=#fefefe
| 527230 ||  || — || September 11, 2007 || Mount Lemmon || Mount Lemmon Survey ||  || align=right data-sort-value="0.49" | 490 m || 
|-id=231 bgcolor=#fefefe
| 527231 ||  || — || October 9, 2007 || Mount Lemmon || Mount Lemmon Survey || NYS || align=right data-sort-value="0.60" | 600 m || 
|-id=232 bgcolor=#d6d6d6
| 527232 ||  || — || October 10, 2007 || Mount Lemmon || Mount Lemmon Survey || TIR || align=right | 2.5 km || 
|-id=233 bgcolor=#d6d6d6
| 527233 ||  || — || October 8, 2007 || Catalina || CSS ||  || align=right | 2.4 km || 
|-id=234 bgcolor=#d6d6d6
| 527234 ||  || — || October 9, 2007 || Mount Lemmon || Mount Lemmon Survey ||  || align=right | 2.0 km || 
|-id=235 bgcolor=#fefefe
| 527235 ||  || — || October 11, 2007 || Mount Lemmon || Mount Lemmon Survey ||  || align=right data-sort-value="0.68" | 680 m || 
|-id=236 bgcolor=#fefefe
| 527236 ||  || — || October 11, 2007 || Mount Lemmon || Mount Lemmon Survey ||  || align=right data-sort-value="0.45" | 450 m || 
|-id=237 bgcolor=#fefefe
| 527237 ||  || — || October 7, 2007 || Mount Lemmon || Mount Lemmon Survey ||  || align=right data-sort-value="0.67" | 670 m || 
|-id=238 bgcolor=#E9E9E9
| 527238 ||  || — || October 8, 2007 || Mount Lemmon || Mount Lemmon Survey ||  || align=right | 1.3 km || 
|-id=239 bgcolor=#E9E9E9
| 527239 ||  || — || October 10, 2007 || Mount Lemmon || Mount Lemmon Survey ||  || align=right | 1.0 km || 
|-id=240 bgcolor=#d6d6d6
| 527240 ||  || — || October 10, 2007 || Kitt Peak || Spacewatch || THM || align=right | 2.1 km || 
|-id=241 bgcolor=#d6d6d6
| 527241 ||  || — || October 10, 2007 || Kitt Peak || Spacewatch ||  || align=right | 2.0 km || 
|-id=242 bgcolor=#d6d6d6
| 527242 ||  || — || September 15, 2007 || Mount Lemmon || Mount Lemmon Survey ||  || align=right | 2.5 km || 
|-id=243 bgcolor=#fefefe
| 527243 ||  || — || October 11, 2007 || Kitt Peak || Spacewatch ||  || align=right data-sort-value="0.71" | 710 m || 
|-id=244 bgcolor=#fefefe
| 527244 ||  || — || September 5, 2007 || Mount Lemmon || Mount Lemmon Survey ||  || align=right data-sort-value="0.59" | 590 m || 
|-id=245 bgcolor=#d6d6d6
| 527245 ||  || — || September 11, 2007 || Mount Lemmon || Mount Lemmon Survey || THM || align=right | 1.9 km || 
|-id=246 bgcolor=#fefefe
| 527246 ||  || — || October 9, 2007 || Kitt Peak || Spacewatch ||  || align=right data-sort-value="0.57" | 570 m || 
|-id=247 bgcolor=#d6d6d6
| 527247 ||  || — || April 2, 2005 || Kitt Peak || Spacewatch ||  || align=right | 3.3 km || 
|-id=248 bgcolor=#d6d6d6
| 527248 ||  || — || September 14, 2007 || Mount Lemmon || Mount Lemmon Survey ||  || align=right | 1.8 km || 
|-id=249 bgcolor=#d6d6d6
| 527249 ||  || — || October 11, 2007 || Mount Lemmon || Mount Lemmon Survey || EOS || align=right | 1.7 km || 
|-id=250 bgcolor=#d6d6d6
| 527250 ||  || — || September 9, 2007 || Kitt Peak || Spacewatch || 3:2 || align=right | 4.2 km || 
|-id=251 bgcolor=#d6d6d6
| 527251 ||  || — || September 11, 2007 || Kitt Peak || Spacewatch ||  || align=right | 2.2 km || 
|-id=252 bgcolor=#fefefe
| 527252 ||  || — || September 12, 2007 || Mount Lemmon || Mount Lemmon Survey || MAS || align=right data-sort-value="0.57" | 570 m || 
|-id=253 bgcolor=#E9E9E9
| 527253 ||  || — || September 12, 2007 || Mount Lemmon || Mount Lemmon Survey ||  || align=right | 2.1 km || 
|-id=254 bgcolor=#E9E9E9
| 527254 ||  || — || October 11, 2007 || Catalina || CSS ||  || align=right | 1.3 km || 
|-id=255 bgcolor=#d6d6d6
| 527255 ||  || — || September 9, 2007 || Kitt Peak || Spacewatch ||  || align=right | 2.5 km || 
|-id=256 bgcolor=#d6d6d6
| 527256 ||  || — || October 10, 2007 || Mount Lemmon || Mount Lemmon Survey ||  || align=right | 1.8 km || 
|-id=257 bgcolor=#d6d6d6
| 527257 ||  || — || September 13, 2007 || Mount Lemmon || Mount Lemmon Survey ||  || align=right | 2.2 km || 
|-id=258 bgcolor=#fefefe
| 527258 ||  || — || October 10, 2007 || Mount Lemmon || Mount Lemmon Survey ||  || align=right data-sort-value="0.62" | 620 m || 
|-id=259 bgcolor=#fefefe
| 527259 ||  || — || October 4, 2007 || Kitt Peak || Spacewatch ||  || align=right data-sort-value="0.77" | 770 m || 
|-id=260 bgcolor=#E9E9E9
| 527260 ||  || — || October 12, 2007 || Kitt Peak || Spacewatch ||  || align=right | 2.1 km || 
|-id=261 bgcolor=#fefefe
| 527261 ||  || — || October 12, 2007 || Kitt Peak || Spacewatch ||  || align=right data-sort-value="0.64" | 640 m || 
|-id=262 bgcolor=#fefefe
| 527262 ||  || — || October 12, 2007 || Kitt Peak || Spacewatch ||  || align=right data-sort-value="0.54" | 540 m || 
|-id=263 bgcolor=#d6d6d6
| 527263 ||  || — || September 9, 2007 || Mount Lemmon || Mount Lemmon Survey || THM || align=right | 1.9 km || 
|-id=264 bgcolor=#E9E9E9
| 527264 ||  || — || September 14, 2007 || Mount Lemmon || Mount Lemmon Survey ||  || align=right | 1.5 km || 
|-id=265 bgcolor=#fefefe
| 527265 ||  || — || October 9, 2007 || Mount Lemmon || Mount Lemmon Survey || NYS || align=right data-sort-value="0.54" | 540 m || 
|-id=266 bgcolor=#d6d6d6
| 527266 ||  || — || September 14, 2007 || Mount Lemmon || Mount Lemmon Survey ||  || align=right | 2.0 km || 
|-id=267 bgcolor=#d6d6d6
| 527267 ||  || — || October 4, 2007 || Kitt Peak || Spacewatch ||  || align=right | 2.2 km || 
|-id=268 bgcolor=#d6d6d6
| 527268 ||  || — || October 12, 2007 || Kitt Peak || Spacewatch || HYG || align=right | 2.5 km || 
|-id=269 bgcolor=#d6d6d6
| 527269 ||  || — || October 12, 2007 || Kitt Peak || Spacewatch ||  || align=right | 2.4 km || 
|-id=270 bgcolor=#fefefe
| 527270 ||  || — || September 25, 2007 || Mount Lemmon || Mount Lemmon Survey || V || align=right data-sort-value="0.50" | 500 m || 
|-id=271 bgcolor=#d6d6d6
| 527271 ||  || — || September 25, 2007 || Mount Lemmon || Mount Lemmon Survey ||  || align=right | 2.8 km || 
|-id=272 bgcolor=#fefefe
| 527272 ||  || — || October 11, 2007 || Kitt Peak || Spacewatch ||  || align=right data-sort-value="0.61" | 610 m || 
|-id=273 bgcolor=#d6d6d6
| 527273 ||  || — || October 11, 2007 || Kitt Peak || Spacewatch || HYG || align=right | 2.1 km || 
|-id=274 bgcolor=#d6d6d6
| 527274 ||  || — || June 22, 2006 || Kitt Peak || Spacewatch ||  || align=right | 3.2 km || 
|-id=275 bgcolor=#fefefe
| 527275 ||  || — || October 11, 2007 || Kitt Peak || Spacewatch ||  || align=right data-sort-value="0.62" | 620 m || 
|-id=276 bgcolor=#fefefe
| 527276 ||  || — || October 11, 2007 || Kitt Peak || Spacewatch || MAS || align=right data-sort-value="0.68" | 680 m || 
|-id=277 bgcolor=#fefefe
| 527277 ||  || — || October 11, 2007 || Kitt Peak || Spacewatch ||  || align=right data-sort-value="0.61" | 610 m || 
|-id=278 bgcolor=#E9E9E9
| 527278 ||  || — || October 11, 2007 || Kitt Peak || Spacewatch ||  || align=right | 1.8 km || 
|-id=279 bgcolor=#E9E9E9
| 527279 ||  || — || September 12, 2007 || Mount Lemmon || Mount Lemmon Survey ||  || align=right | 1.7 km || 
|-id=280 bgcolor=#E9E9E9
| 527280 ||  || — || October 10, 2007 || Mount Lemmon || Mount Lemmon Survey ||  || align=right | 2.1 km || 
|-id=281 bgcolor=#fefefe
| 527281 ||  || — || September 12, 2007 || Catalina || CSS ||  || align=right data-sort-value="0.69" | 690 m || 
|-id=282 bgcolor=#d6d6d6
| 527282 ||  || — || October 13, 2007 || Mount Lemmon || Mount Lemmon Survey ||  || align=right | 3.4 km || 
|-id=283 bgcolor=#d6d6d6
| 527283 ||  || — || October 13, 2007 || Mount Lemmon || Mount Lemmon Survey ||  || align=right | 2.4 km || 
|-id=284 bgcolor=#fefefe
| 527284 ||  || — || October 9, 2007 || Mount Lemmon || Mount Lemmon Survey ||  || align=right data-sort-value="0.63" | 630 m || 
|-id=285 bgcolor=#d6d6d6
| 527285 ||  || — || September 8, 2007 || Mount Lemmon || Mount Lemmon Survey ||  || align=right | 2.0 km || 
|-id=286 bgcolor=#d6d6d6
| 527286 ||  || — || October 14, 2007 || Mount Lemmon || Mount Lemmon Survey ||  || align=right | 1.7 km || 
|-id=287 bgcolor=#fefefe
| 527287 ||  || — || October 14, 2007 || Mount Lemmon || Mount Lemmon Survey ||  || align=right data-sort-value="0.62" | 620 m || 
|-id=288 bgcolor=#E9E9E9
| 527288 ||  || — || October 14, 2007 || Mount Lemmon || Mount Lemmon Survey ||  || align=right | 1.6 km || 
|-id=289 bgcolor=#d6d6d6
| 527289 ||  || — || October 14, 2007 || Mount Lemmon || Mount Lemmon Survey ||  || align=right | 2.8 km || 
|-id=290 bgcolor=#fefefe
| 527290 ||  || — || October 9, 2007 || Kitt Peak || Spacewatch ||  || align=right data-sort-value="0.75" | 750 m || 
|-id=291 bgcolor=#E9E9E9
| 527291 ||  || — || September 10, 2007 || Mount Lemmon || Mount Lemmon Survey || PAD || align=right | 1.4 km || 
|-id=292 bgcolor=#fefefe
| 527292 ||  || — || September 15, 2007 || Mount Lemmon || Mount Lemmon Survey ||  || align=right data-sort-value="0.54" | 540 m || 
|-id=293 bgcolor=#fefefe
| 527293 ||  || — || September 15, 2007 || Anderson Mesa || LONEOS ||  || align=right data-sort-value="0.60" | 600 m || 
|-id=294 bgcolor=#fefefe
| 527294 ||  || — || September 15, 2007 || Kitt Peak || Spacewatch ||  || align=right data-sort-value="0.62" | 620 m || 
|-id=295 bgcolor=#fefefe
| 527295 ||  || — || October 14, 2007 || Mount Lemmon || Mount Lemmon Survey || H || align=right data-sort-value="0.68" | 680 m || 
|-id=296 bgcolor=#fefefe
| 527296 ||  || — || October 14, 2007 || Mount Lemmon || Mount Lemmon Survey ||  || align=right data-sort-value="0.65" | 650 m || 
|-id=297 bgcolor=#E9E9E9
| 527297 ||  || — || October 15, 2007 || Mount Lemmon || Mount Lemmon Survey ||  || align=right | 1.3 km || 
|-id=298 bgcolor=#d6d6d6
| 527298 ||  || — || October 15, 2007 || Kitt Peak || Spacewatch ||  || align=right | 2.3 km || 
|-id=299 bgcolor=#fefefe
| 527299 ||  || — || September 12, 2007 || Catalina || CSS ||  || align=right data-sort-value="0.67" | 670 m || 
|-id=300 bgcolor=#fefefe
| 527300 ||  || — || October 14, 2007 || Kitt Peak || Spacewatch || MAS || align=right data-sort-value="0.49" | 490 m || 
|}

527301–527400 

|-bgcolor=#d6d6d6
| 527301 ||  || — || October 14, 2007 || Kitt Peak || Spacewatch ||  || align=right | 2.1 km || 
|-id=302 bgcolor=#d6d6d6
| 527302 ||  || — || October 14, 2007 || Kitt Peak || Spacewatch || HYG || align=right | 2.1 km || 
|-id=303 bgcolor=#d6d6d6
| 527303 ||  || — || October 14, 2007 || Mount Lemmon || Mount Lemmon Survey ||  || align=right | 3.6 km || 
|-id=304 bgcolor=#d6d6d6
| 527304 ||  || — || October 14, 2007 || Mount Lemmon || Mount Lemmon Survey ||  || align=right | 3.3 km || 
|-id=305 bgcolor=#FA8072
| 527305 ||  || — || October 4, 2007 || Catalina || CSS ||  || align=right data-sort-value="0.67" | 670 m || 
|-id=306 bgcolor=#d6d6d6
| 527306 ||  || — || September 5, 2007 || Mount Lemmon || Mount Lemmon Survey ||  || align=right | 2.8 km || 
|-id=307 bgcolor=#fefefe
| 527307 ||  || — || October 13, 2007 || Mount Lemmon || Mount Lemmon Survey || MAS || align=right data-sort-value="0.52" | 520 m || 
|-id=308 bgcolor=#d6d6d6
| 527308 ||  || — || October 13, 2007 || Mount Lemmon || Mount Lemmon Survey ||  || align=right | 3.8 km || 
|-id=309 bgcolor=#d6d6d6
| 527309 ||  || — || October 13, 2007 || Kitt Peak || Spacewatch ||  || align=right | 2.2 km || 
|-id=310 bgcolor=#d6d6d6
| 527310 ||  || — || October 14, 2007 || Mount Lemmon || Mount Lemmon Survey ||  || align=right | 2.3 km || 
|-id=311 bgcolor=#FA8072
| 527311 ||  || — || September 14, 2007 || Socorro || LINEAR ||  || align=right data-sort-value="0.57" | 570 m || 
|-id=312 bgcolor=#d6d6d6
| 527312 ||  || — || September 9, 2007 || Mount Lemmon || Mount Lemmon Survey || THM || align=right | 1.7 km || 
|-id=313 bgcolor=#fefefe
| 527313 ||  || — || October 11, 2007 || Kitt Peak || Spacewatch ||  || align=right data-sort-value="0.58" | 580 m || 
|-id=314 bgcolor=#d6d6d6
| 527314 ||  || — || October 15, 2007 || Kitt Peak || Spacewatch ||  || align=right | 1.5 km || 
|-id=315 bgcolor=#fefefe
| 527315 ||  || — || September 12, 2007 || Mount Lemmon || Mount Lemmon Survey ||  || align=right data-sort-value="0.74" | 740 m || 
|-id=316 bgcolor=#d6d6d6
| 527316 ||  || — || October 15, 2007 || Catalina || CSS ||  || align=right | 2.9 km || 
|-id=317 bgcolor=#d6d6d6
| 527317 ||  || — || October 14, 2007 || Mount Lemmon || Mount Lemmon Survey ||  || align=right | 2.8 km || 
|-id=318 bgcolor=#E9E9E9
| 527318 ||  || — || October 15, 2007 || Mount Lemmon || Mount Lemmon Survey ||  || align=right | 1.1 km || 
|-id=319 bgcolor=#d6d6d6
| 527319 ||  || — || October 15, 2007 || Kitt Peak || Spacewatch || EOS || align=right | 1.9 km || 
|-id=320 bgcolor=#d6d6d6
| 527320 ||  || — || October 15, 2007 || Kitt Peak || Spacewatch ||  || align=right | 2.1 km || 
|-id=321 bgcolor=#fefefe
| 527321 ||  || — || September 10, 2007 || Mount Lemmon || Mount Lemmon Survey ||  || align=right data-sort-value="0.90" | 900 m || 
|-id=322 bgcolor=#fefefe
| 527322 ||  || — || October 6, 2007 || Kitt Peak || Spacewatch ||  || align=right data-sort-value="0.70" | 700 m || 
|-id=323 bgcolor=#d6d6d6
| 527323 ||  || — || October 15, 2007 || Kitt Peak || Spacewatch || TIR || align=right | 2.1 km || 
|-id=324 bgcolor=#fefefe
| 527324 ||  || — || September 13, 2007 || Mount Lemmon || Mount Lemmon Survey ||  || align=right data-sort-value="0.71" | 710 m || 
|-id=325 bgcolor=#d6d6d6
| 527325 ||  || — || September 8, 2007 || Anderson Mesa || LONEOS || Tj (2.96) || align=right | 3.7 km || 
|-id=326 bgcolor=#fefefe
| 527326 ||  || — || September 25, 2007 || Mount Lemmon || Mount Lemmon Survey || MAS || align=right data-sort-value="0.65" | 650 m || 
|-id=327 bgcolor=#fefefe
| 527327 ||  || — || October 15, 2007 || Kitt Peak || Spacewatch || H || align=right data-sort-value="0.50" | 500 m || 
|-id=328 bgcolor=#C7FF8F
| 527328 ||  || — || October 6, 2007 || Apache Point || A. C. Becker, A. W. Puckett, J. Kubica || centaur || align=right | 61 km || 
|-id=329 bgcolor=#d6d6d6
| 527329 ||  || — || October 15, 2007 || Mount Lemmon || Mount Lemmon Survey ||  || align=right | 2.5 km || 
|-id=330 bgcolor=#d6d6d6
| 527330 ||  || — || October 4, 2007 || Kitt Peak || Spacewatch || THM || align=right | 2.1 km || 
|-id=331 bgcolor=#fefefe
| 527331 ||  || — || October 4, 2007 || Kitt Peak || Spacewatch || V || align=right data-sort-value="0.59" | 590 m || 
|-id=332 bgcolor=#fefefe
| 527332 ||  || — || October 4, 2007 || Kitt Peak || Spacewatch ||  || align=right data-sort-value="0.65" | 650 m || 
|-id=333 bgcolor=#fefefe
| 527333 ||  || — || September 13, 2007 || Mount Lemmon || Mount Lemmon Survey ||  || align=right data-sort-value="0.64" | 640 m || 
|-id=334 bgcolor=#fefefe
| 527334 ||  || — || October 8, 2007 || Kitt Peak || Spacewatch ||  || align=right data-sort-value="0.72" | 720 m || 
|-id=335 bgcolor=#fefefe
| 527335 ||  || — || October 9, 2007 || Kitt Peak || Spacewatch ||  || align=right data-sort-value="0.51" | 510 m || 
|-id=336 bgcolor=#d6d6d6
| 527336 ||  || — || October 9, 2007 || Kitt Peak || Spacewatch ||  || align=right | 2.4 km || 
|-id=337 bgcolor=#d6d6d6
| 527337 ||  || — || October 9, 2007 || Kitt Peak || Spacewatch ||  || align=right | 2.3 km || 
|-id=338 bgcolor=#fefefe
| 527338 ||  || — || October 12, 2007 || Kitt Peak || Spacewatch ||  || align=right data-sort-value="0.75" | 750 m || 
|-id=339 bgcolor=#d6d6d6
| 527339 ||  || — || October 14, 2007 || Mount Lemmon || Mount Lemmon Survey ||  || align=right | 2.4 km || 
|-id=340 bgcolor=#fefefe
| 527340 ||  || — || October 12, 2007 || Mount Lemmon || Mount Lemmon Survey ||  || align=right data-sort-value="0.65" | 650 m || 
|-id=341 bgcolor=#E9E9E9
| 527341 ||  || — || October 11, 2007 || Catalina || CSS ||  || align=right | 1.4 km || 
|-id=342 bgcolor=#d6d6d6
| 527342 ||  || — || October 12, 2007 || Kitt Peak || Spacewatch ||  || align=right | 1.9 km || 
|-id=343 bgcolor=#d6d6d6
| 527343 ||  || — || September 12, 2007 || Mount Lemmon || Mount Lemmon Survey || EOS || align=right | 1.7 km || 
|-id=344 bgcolor=#d6d6d6
| 527344 ||  || — || October 8, 2007 || Catalina || CSS ||  || align=right | 2.5 km || 
|-id=345 bgcolor=#d6d6d6
| 527345 ||  || — || October 8, 2007 || Catalina || CSS ||  || align=right | 3.1 km || 
|-id=346 bgcolor=#d6d6d6
| 527346 ||  || — || October 8, 2007 || Catalina || CSS ||  || align=right | 3.2 km || 
|-id=347 bgcolor=#d6d6d6
| 527347 ||  || — || October 8, 2007 || Catalina || CSS ||  || align=right | 2.9 km || 
|-id=348 bgcolor=#fefefe
| 527348 ||  || — || October 7, 2007 || Catalina || CSS ||  || align=right data-sort-value="0.75" | 750 m || 
|-id=349 bgcolor=#fefefe
| 527349 ||  || — || October 8, 2007 || Catalina || CSS ||  || align=right data-sort-value="0.69" | 690 m || 
|-id=350 bgcolor=#d6d6d6
| 527350 ||  || — || October 5, 2007 || Kitt Peak || Spacewatch ||  || align=right | 2.6 km || 
|-id=351 bgcolor=#d6d6d6
| 527351 ||  || — || October 10, 2007 || Anderson Mesa || LONEOS ||  || align=right | 3.1 km || 
|-id=352 bgcolor=#d6d6d6
| 527352 ||  || — || October 6, 2007 || Kitt Peak || Spacewatch ||  || align=right | 2.1 km || 
|-id=353 bgcolor=#d6d6d6
| 527353 ||  || — || October 7, 2007 || Kitt Peak || Spacewatch || EOS || align=right | 1.8 km || 
|-id=354 bgcolor=#fefefe
| 527354 ||  || — || October 10, 2007 || Kitt Peak || Spacewatch || MAS || align=right data-sort-value="0.60" | 600 m || 
|-id=355 bgcolor=#d6d6d6
| 527355 ||  || — || October 11, 2007 || Kitt Peak || Spacewatch || LIX || align=right | 2.9 km || 
|-id=356 bgcolor=#fefefe
| 527356 ||  || — || October 7, 2007 || Kitt Peak || Spacewatch ||  || align=right data-sort-value="0.72" | 720 m || 
|-id=357 bgcolor=#d6d6d6
| 527357 ||  || — || October 12, 2007 || Mount Lemmon || Mount Lemmon Survey ||  || align=right | 3.1 km || 
|-id=358 bgcolor=#E9E9E9
| 527358 ||  || — || October 14, 2007 || Mount Lemmon || Mount Lemmon Survey ||  || align=right | 1.8 km || 
|-id=359 bgcolor=#d6d6d6
| 527359 ||  || — || October 11, 2007 || Kitt Peak || Spacewatch ||  || align=right | 2.9 km || 
|-id=360 bgcolor=#d6d6d6
| 527360 ||  || — || October 9, 2007 || Kitt Peak || Spacewatch ||  || align=right | 2.0 km || 
|-id=361 bgcolor=#fefefe
| 527361 ||  || — || May 3, 2006 || Mount Lemmon || Mount Lemmon Survey ||  || align=right data-sort-value="0.66" | 660 m || 
|-id=362 bgcolor=#fefefe
| 527362 ||  || — || October 14, 2007 || Mount Lemmon || Mount Lemmon Survey ||  || align=right data-sort-value="0.68" | 680 m || 
|-id=363 bgcolor=#fefefe
| 527363 ||  || — || October 14, 2007 || Mount Lemmon || Mount Lemmon Survey ||  || align=right data-sort-value="0.74" | 740 m || 
|-id=364 bgcolor=#fefefe
| 527364 ||  || — || October 15, 2007 || Mount Lemmon || Mount Lemmon Survey ||  || align=right data-sort-value="0.68" | 680 m || 
|-id=365 bgcolor=#fefefe
| 527365 ||  || — || October 4, 2007 || Catalina || CSS ||  || align=right data-sort-value="0.70" | 700 m || 
|-id=366 bgcolor=#d6d6d6
| 527366 ||  || — || October 4, 2007 || Mount Lemmon || Mount Lemmon Survey ||  || align=right | 2.2 km || 
|-id=367 bgcolor=#d6d6d6
| 527367 ||  || — || October 8, 2007 || Mount Lemmon || Mount Lemmon Survey ||  || align=right | 2.0 km || 
|-id=368 bgcolor=#E9E9E9
| 527368 ||  || — || October 8, 2007 || Mount Lemmon || Mount Lemmon Survey ||  || align=right | 2.0 km || 
|-id=369 bgcolor=#d6d6d6
| 527369 ||  || — || October 8, 2007 || Mount Lemmon || Mount Lemmon Survey ||  || align=right | 2.1 km || 
|-id=370 bgcolor=#d6d6d6
| 527370 ||  || — || October 9, 2007 || Mount Lemmon || Mount Lemmon Survey ||  || align=right | 2.3 km || 
|-id=371 bgcolor=#d6d6d6
| 527371 ||  || — || October 9, 2007 || Catalina || CSS ||  || align=right | 2.2 km || 
|-id=372 bgcolor=#d6d6d6
| 527372 ||  || — || October 9, 2007 || Mount Lemmon || Mount Lemmon Survey ||  || align=right | 2.4 km || 
|-id=373 bgcolor=#E9E9E9
| 527373 ||  || — || October 10, 2007 || Mount Lemmon || Mount Lemmon Survey ||  || align=right | 2.0 km || 
|-id=374 bgcolor=#d6d6d6
| 527374 ||  || — || October 10, 2007 || Catalina || CSS ||  || align=right | 2.5 km || 
|-id=375 bgcolor=#E9E9E9
| 527375 ||  || — || October 10, 2007 || Mount Lemmon || Mount Lemmon Survey ||  || align=right | 2.5 km || 
|-id=376 bgcolor=#d6d6d6
| 527376 ||  || — || October 10, 2007 || Mount Lemmon || Mount Lemmon Survey ||  || align=right | 1.9 km || 
|-id=377 bgcolor=#fefefe
| 527377 ||  || — || October 11, 2007 || Mount Lemmon || Mount Lemmon Survey ||  || align=right data-sort-value="0.69" | 690 m || 
|-id=378 bgcolor=#fefefe
| 527378 ||  || — || October 12, 2007 || Mount Lemmon || Mount Lemmon Survey ||  || align=right data-sort-value="0.61" | 610 m || 
|-id=379 bgcolor=#E9E9E9
| 527379 ||  || — || October 12, 2007 || Mount Lemmon || Mount Lemmon Survey ||  || align=right | 2.4 km || 
|-id=380 bgcolor=#fefefe
| 527380 ||  || — || October 12, 2007 || Mount Lemmon || Mount Lemmon Survey ||  || align=right data-sort-value="0.80" | 800 m || 
|-id=381 bgcolor=#d6d6d6
| 527381 ||  || — || October 12, 2007 || Mount Lemmon || Mount Lemmon Survey ||  || align=right | 2.4 km || 
|-id=382 bgcolor=#d6d6d6
| 527382 ||  || — || October 12, 2007 || Mount Lemmon || Mount Lemmon Survey ||  || align=right | 1.9 km || 
|-id=383 bgcolor=#fefefe
| 527383 ||  || — || October 12, 2007 || Mount Lemmon || Mount Lemmon Survey ||  || align=right data-sort-value="0.59" | 590 m || 
|-id=384 bgcolor=#fefefe
| 527384 ||  || — || October 13, 2007 || Mount Lemmon || Mount Lemmon Survey ||  || align=right data-sort-value="0.59" | 590 m || 
|-id=385 bgcolor=#d6d6d6
| 527385 ||  || — || October 14, 2007 || Mount Lemmon || Mount Lemmon Survey ||  || align=right | 2.0 km || 
|-id=386 bgcolor=#E9E9E9
| 527386 ||  || — || October 15, 2007 || Mount Lemmon || Mount Lemmon Survey ||  || align=right | 1.9 km || 
|-id=387 bgcolor=#d6d6d6
| 527387 ||  || — || October 15, 2007 || Mount Lemmon || Mount Lemmon Survey ||  || align=right | 2.0 km || 
|-id=388 bgcolor=#d6d6d6
| 527388 ||  || — || October 15, 2007 || Mount Lemmon || Mount Lemmon Survey ||  || align=right | 2.2 km || 
|-id=389 bgcolor=#d6d6d6
| 527389 ||  || — || October 9, 2007 || Catalina || CSS ||  || align=right | 3.9 km || 
|-id=390 bgcolor=#d6d6d6
| 527390 ||  || — || October 9, 2007 || Catalina || CSS ||  || align=right | 3.1 km || 
|-id=391 bgcolor=#fefefe
| 527391 ||  || — || October 10, 2007 || Mount Lemmon || Mount Lemmon Survey || NYS || align=right data-sort-value="0.69" | 690 m || 
|-id=392 bgcolor=#d6d6d6
| 527392 ||  || — || October 16, 2007 || Catalina || CSS || TIR || align=right | 2.1 km || 
|-id=393 bgcolor=#d6d6d6
| 527393 ||  || — || October 18, 2007 || Mount Lemmon || Mount Lemmon Survey ||  || align=right | 2.2 km || 
|-id=394 bgcolor=#E9E9E9
| 527394 ||  || — || October 8, 2007 || Mount Lemmon || Mount Lemmon Survey ||  || align=right | 1.4 km || 
|-id=395 bgcolor=#fefefe
| 527395 ||  || — || October 16, 2007 || Kitt Peak || Spacewatch ||  || align=right data-sort-value="0.52" | 520 m || 
|-id=396 bgcolor=#fefefe
| 527396 ||  || — || September 9, 2007 || Mount Lemmon || Mount Lemmon Survey ||  || align=right data-sort-value="0.58" | 580 m || 
|-id=397 bgcolor=#fefefe
| 527397 ||  || — || October 19, 2007 || Kitt Peak || Spacewatch ||  || align=right data-sort-value="0.62" | 620 m || 
|-id=398 bgcolor=#fefefe
| 527398 ||  || — || October 18, 2007 || Anderson Mesa || LONEOS ||  || align=right data-sort-value="0.94" | 940 m || 
|-id=399 bgcolor=#d6d6d6
| 527399 ||  || — || October 18, 2007 || Kitt Peak || Spacewatch ||  || align=right | 3.0 km || 
|-id=400 bgcolor=#fefefe
| 527400 ||  || — || October 20, 2007 || Catalina || CSS || H || align=right data-sort-value="0.56" | 560 m || 
|}

527401–527500 

|-bgcolor=#d6d6d6
| 527401 ||  || — || October 9, 2007 || Mount Lemmon || Mount Lemmon Survey ||  || align=right | 3.1 km || 
|-id=402 bgcolor=#d6d6d6
| 527402 ||  || — || September 25, 2007 || Mount Lemmon || Mount Lemmon Survey ||  || align=right | 2.4 km || 
|-id=403 bgcolor=#fefefe
| 527403 ||  || — || September 25, 2007 || Mount Lemmon || Mount Lemmon Survey ||  || align=right data-sort-value="0.68" | 680 m || 
|-id=404 bgcolor=#fefefe
| 527404 ||  || — || October 24, 2007 || Mount Lemmon || Mount Lemmon Survey ||  || align=right data-sort-value="0.63" | 630 m || 
|-id=405 bgcolor=#fefefe
| 527405 ||  || — || October 30, 2007 || Kitt Peak || Spacewatch ||  || align=right data-sort-value="0.59" | 590 m || 
|-id=406 bgcolor=#fefefe
| 527406 ||  || — || October 14, 2007 || Kitt Peak || Spacewatch ||  || align=right data-sort-value="0.62" | 620 m || 
|-id=407 bgcolor=#d6d6d6
| 527407 ||  || — || September 13, 2007 || Mount Lemmon || Mount Lemmon Survey ||  || align=right | 3.2 km || 
|-id=408 bgcolor=#fefefe
| 527408 ||  || — || October 12, 2007 || Catalina || CSS || H || align=right data-sort-value="0.72" | 720 m || 
|-id=409 bgcolor=#fefefe
| 527409 ||  || — || October 30, 2007 || Mount Lemmon || Mount Lemmon Survey || NYS || align=right data-sort-value="0.66" | 660 m || 
|-id=410 bgcolor=#fefefe
| 527410 ||  || — || October 5, 2007 || Kitt Peak || Spacewatch ||  || align=right data-sort-value="0.67" | 670 m || 
|-id=411 bgcolor=#d6d6d6
| 527411 ||  || — || October 6, 2007 || Kitt Peak || Spacewatch || THM || align=right | 2.1 km || 
|-id=412 bgcolor=#fefefe
| 527412 ||  || — || October 8, 2007 || Mount Lemmon || Mount Lemmon Survey ||  || align=right data-sort-value="0.63" | 630 m || 
|-id=413 bgcolor=#d6d6d6
| 527413 ||  || — || October 12, 2007 || Kitt Peak || Spacewatch ||  || align=right | 2.4 km || 
|-id=414 bgcolor=#d6d6d6
| 527414 ||  || — || October 31, 2007 || Kitt Peak || Spacewatch ||  || align=right | 2.2 km || 
|-id=415 bgcolor=#d6d6d6
| 527415 ||  || — || October 4, 2007 || Kitt Peak || Spacewatch ||  || align=right | 2.7 km || 
|-id=416 bgcolor=#d6d6d6
| 527416 ||  || — || October 31, 2007 || Mount Lemmon || Mount Lemmon Survey ||  || align=right | 2.5 km || 
|-id=417 bgcolor=#d6d6d6
| 527417 ||  || — || October 31, 2007 || Mount Lemmon || Mount Lemmon Survey ||  || align=right | 1.9 km || 
|-id=418 bgcolor=#fefefe
| 527418 ||  || — || October 31, 2007 || Catalina || CSS ||  || align=right data-sort-value="0.83" | 830 m || 
|-id=419 bgcolor=#fefefe
| 527419 ||  || — || October 16, 2007 || Kitt Peak || Spacewatch ||  || align=right data-sort-value="0.57" | 570 m || 
|-id=420 bgcolor=#fefefe
| 527420 ||  || — || September 18, 2007 || Mount Lemmon || Mount Lemmon Survey || NYS || align=right data-sort-value="0.55" | 550 m || 
|-id=421 bgcolor=#d6d6d6
| 527421 ||  || — || October 8, 2007 || Kitt Peak || Spacewatch || THM || align=right | 2.2 km || 
|-id=422 bgcolor=#d6d6d6
| 527422 ||  || — || October 12, 2007 || Kitt Peak || Spacewatch || THM || align=right | 2.0 km || 
|-id=423 bgcolor=#fefefe
| 527423 ||  || — || October 30, 2007 || Kitt Peak || Spacewatch ||  || align=right data-sort-value="0.58" | 580 m || 
|-id=424 bgcolor=#fefefe
| 527424 ||  || — || October 30, 2007 || Kitt Peak || Spacewatch ||  || align=right data-sort-value="0.59" | 590 m || 
|-id=425 bgcolor=#d6d6d6
| 527425 ||  || — || October 9, 2007 || Mount Lemmon || Mount Lemmon Survey ||  || align=right | 3.5 km || 
|-id=426 bgcolor=#fefefe
| 527426 ||  || — || October 10, 2007 || Kitt Peak || Spacewatch ||  || align=right data-sort-value="0.58" | 580 m || 
|-id=427 bgcolor=#d6d6d6
| 527427 ||  || — || October 7, 2007 || Mount Lemmon || Mount Lemmon Survey ||  || align=right | 3.1 km || 
|-id=428 bgcolor=#d6d6d6
| 527428 ||  || — || October 31, 2007 || Mount Lemmon || Mount Lemmon Survey ||  || align=right | 2.1 km || 
|-id=429 bgcolor=#fefefe
| 527429 ||  || — || October 15, 2007 || Kitt Peak || Spacewatch ||  || align=right data-sort-value="0.71" | 710 m || 
|-id=430 bgcolor=#d6d6d6
| 527430 ||  || — || October 10, 2007 || Mount Lemmon || Mount Lemmon Survey ||  || align=right | 2.8 km || 
|-id=431 bgcolor=#d6d6d6
| 527431 ||  || — || October 30, 2007 || Kitt Peak || Spacewatch ||  || align=right | 2.3 km || 
|-id=432 bgcolor=#d6d6d6
| 527432 ||  || — || October 30, 2007 || Kitt Peak || Spacewatch || THM || align=right | 1.9 km || 
|-id=433 bgcolor=#d6d6d6
| 527433 ||  || — || October 31, 2007 || Kitt Peak || Spacewatch ||  || align=right | 2.1 km || 
|-id=434 bgcolor=#fefefe
| 527434 ||  || — || September 10, 2007 || Mount Lemmon || Mount Lemmon Survey ||  || align=right data-sort-value="0.69" | 690 m || 
|-id=435 bgcolor=#fefefe
| 527435 ||  || — || September 11, 2007 || Mount Lemmon || Mount Lemmon Survey ||  || align=right data-sort-value="0.54" | 540 m || 
|-id=436 bgcolor=#fefefe
| 527436 ||  || — || September 10, 2007 || Mount Lemmon || Mount Lemmon Survey ||  || align=right data-sort-value="0.75" | 750 m || 
|-id=437 bgcolor=#d6d6d6
| 527437 ||  || — || October 31, 2007 || Kitt Peak || Spacewatch ||  || align=right | 3.0 km || 
|-id=438 bgcolor=#fefefe
| 527438 ||  || — || October 31, 2007 || Kitt Peak || Spacewatch ||  || align=right data-sort-value="0.62" | 620 m || 
|-id=439 bgcolor=#fefefe
| 527439 ||  || — || September 8, 2007 || Mount Lemmon || Mount Lemmon Survey ||  || align=right data-sort-value="0.65" | 650 m || 
|-id=440 bgcolor=#E9E9E9
| 527440 ||  || — || September 12, 2007 || Mount Lemmon || Mount Lemmon Survey ||  || align=right | 1.4 km || 
|-id=441 bgcolor=#d6d6d6
| 527441 ||  || — || October 18, 2007 || Mount Lemmon || Mount Lemmon Survey ||  || align=right | 1.9 km || 
|-id=442 bgcolor=#fefefe
| 527442 ||  || — || September 25, 2007 || Mount Lemmon || Mount Lemmon Survey ||  || align=right data-sort-value="0.56" | 560 m || 
|-id=443 bgcolor=#C7FF8F
| 527443 ||  || — || October 30, 2007 || Apache Point || SDSS || centaur || align=right | 35 km || 
|-id=444 bgcolor=#fefefe
| 527444 ||  || — || October 20, 2007 || Mount Lemmon || Mount Lemmon Survey ||  || align=right data-sort-value="0.65" | 650 m || 
|-id=445 bgcolor=#d6d6d6
| 527445 ||  || — || October 24, 2007 || Mount Lemmon || Mount Lemmon Survey ||  || align=right | 2.3 km || 
|-id=446 bgcolor=#fefefe
| 527446 ||  || — || October 20, 2007 || Mount Lemmon || Mount Lemmon Survey ||  || align=right data-sort-value="0.62" | 620 m || 
|-id=447 bgcolor=#fefefe
| 527447 ||  || — || October 20, 2007 || Mount Lemmon || Mount Lemmon Survey ||  || align=right data-sort-value="0.63" | 630 m || 
|-id=448 bgcolor=#d6d6d6
| 527448 ||  || — || October 20, 2007 || Mount Lemmon || Mount Lemmon Survey || THM || align=right | 1.8 km || 
|-id=449 bgcolor=#fefefe
| 527449 ||  || — || October 20, 2007 || Mount Lemmon || Mount Lemmon Survey ||  || align=right data-sort-value="0.51" | 510 m || 
|-id=450 bgcolor=#fefefe
| 527450 ||  || — || October 16, 2007 || Catalina || CSS ||  || align=right data-sort-value="0.93" | 930 m || 
|-id=451 bgcolor=#d6d6d6
| 527451 ||  || — || September 11, 2007 || Mount Lemmon || Mount Lemmon Survey || (1298) || align=right | 2.1 km || 
|-id=452 bgcolor=#d6d6d6
| 527452 ||  || — || October 18, 2007 || Kitt Peak || Spacewatch ||  || align=right | 1.6 km || 
|-id=453 bgcolor=#fefefe
| 527453 ||  || — || October 12, 2007 || Kitt Peak || Spacewatch ||  || align=right data-sort-value="0.51" | 510 m || 
|-id=454 bgcolor=#fefefe
| 527454 ||  || — || October 18, 2007 || Kitt Peak || Spacewatch ||  || align=right data-sort-value="0.51" | 510 m || 
|-id=455 bgcolor=#d6d6d6
| 527455 ||  || — || September 8, 2007 || Mount Lemmon || Mount Lemmon Survey ||  || align=right | 3.4 km || 
|-id=456 bgcolor=#d6d6d6
| 527456 ||  || — || October 18, 2007 || Kitt Peak || Spacewatch ||  || align=right | 2.8 km || 
|-id=457 bgcolor=#fefefe
| 527457 ||  || — || October 20, 2007 || Mount Lemmon || Mount Lemmon Survey ||  || align=right data-sort-value="0.58" | 580 m || 
|-id=458 bgcolor=#d6d6d6
| 527458 ||  || — || October 21, 2007 || Mount Lemmon || Mount Lemmon Survey ||  || align=right | 2.7 km || 
|-id=459 bgcolor=#E9E9E9
| 527459 ||  || — || October 16, 2007 || Mount Lemmon || Mount Lemmon Survey ||  || align=right | 2.2 km || 
|-id=460 bgcolor=#d6d6d6
| 527460 ||  || — || October 17, 2007 || Catalina || CSS || Tj (2.97) || align=right | 4.7 km || 
|-id=461 bgcolor=#fefefe
| 527461 ||  || — || October 18, 2007 || Mount Lemmon || Mount Lemmon Survey ||  || align=right data-sort-value="0.64" | 640 m || 
|-id=462 bgcolor=#E9E9E9
| 527462 ||  || — || September 11, 2007 || Mount Lemmon || Mount Lemmon Survey ||  || align=right | 1.0 km || 
|-id=463 bgcolor=#fefefe
| 527463 ||  || — || October 18, 2007 || Mount Lemmon || Mount Lemmon Survey ||  || align=right data-sort-value="0.68" | 680 m || 
|-id=464 bgcolor=#E9E9E9
| 527464 ||  || — || May 20, 2006 || Kitt Peak || Spacewatch ||  || align=right | 2.1 km || 
|-id=465 bgcolor=#d6d6d6
| 527465 ||  || — || October 19, 2007 || Mount Lemmon || Mount Lemmon Survey ||  || align=right | 2.7 km || 
|-id=466 bgcolor=#d6d6d6
| 527466 ||  || — || October 20, 2007 || Mount Lemmon || Mount Lemmon Survey ||  || align=right | 1.8 km || 
|-id=467 bgcolor=#fefefe
| 527467 ||  || — || October 21, 2007 || Mount Lemmon || Mount Lemmon Survey ||  || align=right data-sort-value="0.65" | 650 m || 
|-id=468 bgcolor=#E9E9E9
| 527468 ||  || — || October 21, 2007 || Mount Lemmon || Mount Lemmon Survey ||  || align=right | 2.0 km || 
|-id=469 bgcolor=#d6d6d6
| 527469 ||  || — || October 21, 2007 || Mount Lemmon || Mount Lemmon Survey ||  || align=right | 4.4 km || 
|-id=470 bgcolor=#d6d6d6
| 527470 ||  || — || October 21, 2007 || Mount Lemmon || Mount Lemmon Survey ||  || align=right | 3.1 km || 
|-id=471 bgcolor=#E9E9E9
| 527471 ||  || — || May 6, 2006 || Mount Lemmon || Mount Lemmon Survey ||  || align=right | 2.3 km || 
|-id=472 bgcolor=#d6d6d6
| 527472 ||  || — || October 24, 2007 || Mount Lemmon || Mount Lemmon Survey ||  || align=right | 2.9 km || 
|-id=473 bgcolor=#fefefe
| 527473 ||  || — || October 30, 2007 || Catalina || CSS ||  || align=right data-sort-value="0.73" | 730 m || 
|-id=474 bgcolor=#d6d6d6
| 527474 ||  || — || October 30, 2007 || Mount Lemmon || Mount Lemmon Survey ||  || align=right | 1.7 km || 
|-id=475 bgcolor=#E9E9E9
| 527475 ||  || — || October 30, 2007 || Mount Lemmon || Mount Lemmon Survey ||  || align=right | 1.8 km || 
|-id=476 bgcolor=#d6d6d6
| 527476 ||  || — || October 31, 2007 || Mount Lemmon || Mount Lemmon Survey ||  || align=right | 2.4 km || 
|-id=477 bgcolor=#d6d6d6
| 527477 ||  || — || November 1, 2007 || Charleston || ARO ||  || align=right | 2.2 km || 
|-id=478 bgcolor=#d6d6d6
| 527478 ||  || — || October 8, 2007 || Catalina || CSS ||  || align=right | 3.1 km || 
|-id=479 bgcolor=#d6d6d6
| 527479 ||  || — || November 3, 2007 || Mount Lemmon || Mount Lemmon Survey || Tj (2.97) || align=right | 4.3 km || 
|-id=480 bgcolor=#d6d6d6
| 527480 ||  || — || October 10, 2007 || Kitt Peak || Spacewatch || EOS || align=right | 1.5 km || 
|-id=481 bgcolor=#E9E9E9
| 527481 ||  || — || October 12, 2007 || Mount Lemmon || Mount Lemmon Survey || EUN || align=right | 1.3 km || 
|-id=482 bgcolor=#d6d6d6
| 527482 ||  || — || November 1, 2007 || Kitt Peak || Spacewatch ||  || align=right | 2.4 km || 
|-id=483 bgcolor=#d6d6d6
| 527483 ||  || — || November 1, 2007 || Mount Lemmon || Mount Lemmon Survey ||  || align=right | 2.7 km || 
|-id=484 bgcolor=#fefefe
| 527484 ||  || — || October 10, 2007 || Kitt Peak || Spacewatch ||  || align=right data-sort-value="0.65" | 650 m || 
|-id=485 bgcolor=#E9E9E9
| 527485 ||  || — || November 1, 2007 || Mount Lemmon || Mount Lemmon Survey || AST || align=right | 1.4 km || 
|-id=486 bgcolor=#fefefe
| 527486 ||  || — || November 2, 2007 || Mount Lemmon || Mount Lemmon Survey ||  || align=right data-sort-value="0.73" | 730 m || 
|-id=487 bgcolor=#d6d6d6
| 527487 ||  || — || November 2, 2007 || Kitt Peak || Spacewatch ||  || align=right | 2.4 km || 
|-id=488 bgcolor=#fefefe
| 527488 ||  || — || November 2, 2007 || Kitt Peak || Spacewatch ||  || align=right data-sort-value="0.94" | 940 m || 
|-id=489 bgcolor=#E9E9E9
| 527489 ||  || — || October 11, 2007 || Kitt Peak || Spacewatch ||  || align=right | 1.8 km || 
|-id=490 bgcolor=#d6d6d6
| 527490 ||  || — || October 15, 2007 || Kitt Peak || Spacewatch ||  || align=right | 3.0 km || 
|-id=491 bgcolor=#fefefe
| 527491 ||  || — || October 11, 2007 || Kitt Peak || Spacewatch ||  || align=right data-sort-value="0.47" | 470 m || 
|-id=492 bgcolor=#E9E9E9
| 527492 ||  || — || November 3, 2007 || Mount Lemmon || Mount Lemmon Survey ||  || align=right | 2.0 km || 
|-id=493 bgcolor=#d6d6d6
| 527493 ||  || — || October 18, 2007 || Kitt Peak || Spacewatch ||  || align=right | 2.6 km || 
|-id=494 bgcolor=#d6d6d6
| 527494 ||  || — || November 1, 2007 || Kitt Peak || Spacewatch ||  || align=right | 2.5 km || 
|-id=495 bgcolor=#d6d6d6
| 527495 ||  || — || October 21, 2007 || Kitt Peak || Spacewatch || VER || align=right | 2.3 km || 
|-id=496 bgcolor=#d6d6d6
| 527496 ||  || — || November 1, 2007 || Kitt Peak || Spacewatch ||  || align=right | 2.7 km || 
|-id=497 bgcolor=#fefefe
| 527497 ||  || — || November 1, 2007 || Kitt Peak || Spacewatch ||  || align=right data-sort-value="0.68" | 680 m || 
|-id=498 bgcolor=#fefefe
| 527498 ||  || — || November 1, 2007 || Kitt Peak || Spacewatch ||  || align=right data-sort-value="0.61" | 610 m || 
|-id=499 bgcolor=#d6d6d6
| 527499 ||  || — || October 9, 2007 || Kitt Peak || Spacewatch ||  || align=right | 2.3 km || 
|-id=500 bgcolor=#d6d6d6
| 527500 ||  || — || November 1, 2007 || Kitt Peak || Spacewatch ||  || align=right | 2.9 km || 
|}

527501–527600 

|-bgcolor=#d6d6d6
| 527501 ||  || — || November 1, 2007 || Kitt Peak || Spacewatch ||  || align=right | 2.7 km || 
|-id=502 bgcolor=#fefefe
| 527502 ||  || — || November 1, 2007 || Kitt Peak || Spacewatch ||  || align=right data-sort-value="0.54" | 540 m || 
|-id=503 bgcolor=#d6d6d6
| 527503 ||  || — || October 20, 2007 || Mount Lemmon || Mount Lemmon Survey ||  || align=right | 1.5 km || 
|-id=504 bgcolor=#fefefe
| 527504 ||  || — || November 1, 2007 || Kitt Peak || Spacewatch || H || align=right data-sort-value="0.64" | 640 m || 
|-id=505 bgcolor=#d6d6d6
| 527505 ||  || — || October 21, 2007 || Catalina || CSS ||  || align=right | 2.5 km || 
|-id=506 bgcolor=#d6d6d6
| 527506 ||  || — || November 1, 2007 || Kitt Peak || Spacewatch || TIR || align=right | 2.9 km || 
|-id=507 bgcolor=#fefefe
| 527507 ||  || — || November 2, 2007 || Kitt Peak || Spacewatch ||  || align=right data-sort-value="0.65" | 650 m || 
|-id=508 bgcolor=#d6d6d6
| 527508 ||  || — || November 3, 2007 || Kitt Peak || Spacewatch || THM || align=right | 2.0 km || 
|-id=509 bgcolor=#fefefe
| 527509 ||  || — || October 15, 2007 || Mount Lemmon || Mount Lemmon Survey || H || align=right data-sort-value="0.60" | 600 m || 
|-id=510 bgcolor=#fefefe
| 527510 ||  || — || October 30, 2007 || Kitt Peak || Spacewatch || H || align=right data-sort-value="0.63" | 630 m || 
|-id=511 bgcolor=#d6d6d6
| 527511 ||  || — || September 10, 2007 || Mount Lemmon || Mount Lemmon Survey ||  || align=right | 2.5 km || 
|-id=512 bgcolor=#d6d6d6
| 527512 ||  || — || October 18, 2007 || Kitt Peak || Spacewatch ||  || align=right | 1.9 km || 
|-id=513 bgcolor=#fefefe
| 527513 ||  || — || November 3, 2007 || Kitt Peak || Spacewatch || MAS || align=right data-sort-value="0.46" | 460 m || 
|-id=514 bgcolor=#fefefe
| 527514 ||  || — || November 3, 2007 || Kitt Peak || Spacewatch || NYS || align=right data-sort-value="0.41" | 410 m || 
|-id=515 bgcolor=#E9E9E9
| 527515 ||  || — || October 8, 2007 || Kitt Peak || Spacewatch ||  || align=right | 1.8 km || 
|-id=516 bgcolor=#fefefe
| 527516 ||  || — || October 10, 2007 || Mount Lemmon || Mount Lemmon Survey ||  || align=right data-sort-value="0.72" | 720 m || 
|-id=517 bgcolor=#fefefe
| 527517 ||  || — || October 12, 2007 || Socorro || LINEAR ||  || align=right data-sort-value="0.69" | 690 m || 
|-id=518 bgcolor=#d6d6d6
| 527518 ||  || — || November 2, 2007 || Socorro || LINEAR ||  || align=right | 3.4 km || 
|-id=519 bgcolor=#d6d6d6
| 527519 ||  || — || October 9, 2007 || Catalina || CSS ||  || align=right | 2.2 km || 
|-id=520 bgcolor=#fefefe
| 527520 ||  || — || October 24, 2007 || Mount Lemmon || Mount Lemmon Survey ||  || align=right data-sort-value="0.63" | 630 m || 
|-id=521 bgcolor=#d6d6d6
| 527521 ||  || — || September 14, 2007 || Mount Lemmon || Mount Lemmon Survey ||  || align=right | 3.0 km || 
|-id=522 bgcolor=#d6d6d6
| 527522 ||  || — || November 1, 2007 || Kitt Peak || Spacewatch ||  || align=right | 2.7 km || 
|-id=523 bgcolor=#E9E9E9
| 527523 ||  || — || November 1, 2007 || Kitt Peak || Spacewatch ||  || align=right | 1.5 km || 
|-id=524 bgcolor=#d6d6d6
| 527524 ||  || — || November 3, 2007 || Kitt Peak || Spacewatch || THM || align=right | 1.6 km || 
|-id=525 bgcolor=#E9E9E9
| 527525 ||  || — || October 30, 2007 || Kitt Peak || Spacewatch ||  || align=right | 1.7 km || 
|-id=526 bgcolor=#d6d6d6
| 527526 ||  || — || November 3, 2007 || Kitt Peak || Spacewatch ||  || align=right | 2.5 km || 
|-id=527 bgcolor=#d6d6d6
| 527527 ||  || — || October 10, 2007 || Mount Lemmon || Mount Lemmon Survey ||  || align=right | 3.5 km || 
|-id=528 bgcolor=#d6d6d6
| 527528 ||  || — || October 14, 2007 || Mount Lemmon || Mount Lemmon Survey ||  || align=right | 2.5 km || 
|-id=529 bgcolor=#d6d6d6
| 527529 ||  || — || November 5, 2007 || Kitt Peak || Spacewatch ||  || align=right | 2.1 km || 
|-id=530 bgcolor=#fefefe
| 527530 ||  || — || September 9, 2007 || Mount Lemmon || Mount Lemmon Survey ||  || align=right data-sort-value="0.85" | 850 m || 
|-id=531 bgcolor=#d6d6d6
| 527531 ||  || — || September 14, 1996 || Kitt Peak || Spacewatch ||  || align=right | 2.3 km || 
|-id=532 bgcolor=#d6d6d6
| 527532 ||  || — || October 12, 2007 || Kitt Peak || Spacewatch ||  || align=right | 1.9 km || 
|-id=533 bgcolor=#d6d6d6
| 527533 ||  || — || November 3, 2007 || Kitt Peak || Spacewatch ||  || align=right | 2.8 km || 
|-id=534 bgcolor=#fefefe
| 527534 ||  || — || October 8, 2007 || Catalina || CSS || H || align=right data-sort-value="0.55" | 550 m || 
|-id=535 bgcolor=#fefefe
| 527535 ||  || — || October 10, 2007 || Kitt Peak || Spacewatch || NYS || align=right data-sort-value="0.53" | 530 m || 
|-id=536 bgcolor=#fefefe
| 527536 ||  || — || November 3, 2007 || Kitt Peak || Spacewatch ||  || align=right data-sort-value="0.56" | 560 m || 
|-id=537 bgcolor=#fefefe
| 527537 ||  || — || November 4, 2007 || Kitt Peak || Spacewatch ||  || align=right data-sort-value="0.75" | 750 m || 
|-id=538 bgcolor=#d6d6d6
| 527538 ||  || — || September 10, 2007 || Mount Lemmon || Mount Lemmon Survey ||  || align=right | 2.1 km || 
|-id=539 bgcolor=#d6d6d6
| 527539 ||  || — || October 20, 2007 || Mount Lemmon || Mount Lemmon Survey ||  || align=right | 2.9 km || 
|-id=540 bgcolor=#d6d6d6
| 527540 ||  || — || November 4, 2007 || Kitt Peak || Spacewatch || VER || align=right | 2.2 km || 
|-id=541 bgcolor=#fefefe
| 527541 ||  || — || November 4, 2007 || Kitt Peak || Spacewatch || MAS || align=right data-sort-value="0.53" | 530 m || 
|-id=542 bgcolor=#fefefe
| 527542 ||  || — || November 7, 2007 || Catalina || CSS ||  || align=right data-sort-value="0.58" | 580 m || 
|-id=543 bgcolor=#d6d6d6
| 527543 ||  || — || October 19, 2007 || Kitt Peak || Spacewatch ||  || align=right | 2.7 km || 
|-id=544 bgcolor=#fefefe
| 527544 ||  || — || November 2, 2007 || Mount Lemmon || Mount Lemmon Survey ||  || align=right data-sort-value="0.59" | 590 m || 
|-id=545 bgcolor=#d6d6d6
| 527545 ||  || — || October 9, 2007 || Kitt Peak || Spacewatch ||  || align=right | 2.7 km || 
|-id=546 bgcolor=#fefefe
| 527546 ||  || — || November 5, 2007 || Kitt Peak || Spacewatch ||  || align=right data-sort-value="0.49" | 490 m || 
|-id=547 bgcolor=#d6d6d6
| 527547 ||  || — || November 5, 2007 || Kitt Peak || Spacewatch ||  || align=right | 2.2 km || 
|-id=548 bgcolor=#E9E9E9
| 527548 ||  || — || November 5, 2007 || Mount Lemmon || Mount Lemmon Survey ||  || align=right | 2.5 km || 
|-id=549 bgcolor=#fefefe
| 527549 ||  || — || October 20, 2007 || Mount Lemmon || Mount Lemmon Survey ||  || align=right data-sort-value="0.61" | 610 m || 
|-id=550 bgcolor=#d6d6d6
| 527550 ||  || — || October 20, 2007 || Mount Lemmon || Mount Lemmon Survey ||  || align=right | 2.9 km || 
|-id=551 bgcolor=#d6d6d6
| 527551 ||  || — || November 5, 2007 || Kitt Peak || Spacewatch ||  || align=right | 2.0 km || 
|-id=552 bgcolor=#d6d6d6
| 527552 ||  || — || October 24, 2007 || Mount Lemmon || Mount Lemmon Survey ||  || align=right | 2.7 km || 
|-id=553 bgcolor=#d6d6d6
| 527553 ||  || — || November 5, 2007 || Kitt Peak || Spacewatch ||  || align=right | 3.3 km || 
|-id=554 bgcolor=#d6d6d6
| 527554 ||  || — || October 16, 2007 || Mount Lemmon || Mount Lemmon Survey ||  || align=right | 3.4 km || 
|-id=555 bgcolor=#d6d6d6
| 527555 ||  || — || October 7, 2007 || Mount Lemmon || Mount Lemmon Survey || VER || align=right | 2.5 km || 
|-id=556 bgcolor=#E9E9E9
| 527556 ||  || — || October 10, 2007 || Mount Lemmon || Mount Lemmon Survey ||  || align=right | 2.8 km || 
|-id=557 bgcolor=#fefefe
| 527557 ||  || — || November 8, 2007 || Mount Lemmon || Mount Lemmon Survey ||  || align=right data-sort-value="0.73" | 730 m || 
|-id=558 bgcolor=#FA8072
| 527558 ||  || — || November 2, 2007 || Catalina || CSS || H || align=right data-sort-value="0.52" | 520 m || 
|-id=559 bgcolor=#d6d6d6
| 527559 ||  || — || October 12, 2007 || Kitt Peak || Spacewatch ||  || align=right | 1.9 km || 
|-id=560 bgcolor=#fefefe
| 527560 ||  || — || November 15, 2007 || Catalina || CSS || H || align=right data-sort-value="0.73" | 730 m || 
|-id=561 bgcolor=#d6d6d6
| 527561 ||  || — || November 4, 2007 || Mount Lemmon || Mount Lemmon Survey ||  || align=right | 2.5 km || 
|-id=562 bgcolor=#d6d6d6
| 527562 ||  || — || November 5, 2007 || Mount Lemmon || Mount Lemmon Survey ||  || align=right | 2.5 km || 
|-id=563 bgcolor=#d6d6d6
| 527563 ||  || — || October 5, 2007 || Kitt Peak || Spacewatch || KOR || align=right | 1.2 km || 
|-id=564 bgcolor=#d6d6d6
| 527564 ||  || — || November 9, 2007 || Kitt Peak || Spacewatch ||  || align=right | 2.7 km || 
|-id=565 bgcolor=#fefefe
| 527565 ||  || — || October 18, 2007 || Mount Lemmon || Mount Lemmon Survey || MAS || align=right data-sort-value="0.58" | 580 m || 
|-id=566 bgcolor=#d6d6d6
| 527566 ||  || — || November 1, 2007 || Kitt Peak || Spacewatch ||  || align=right | 3.0 km || 
|-id=567 bgcolor=#d6d6d6
| 527567 ||  || — || November 9, 2007 || Kitt Peak || Spacewatch ||  || align=right | 2.9 km || 
|-id=568 bgcolor=#d6d6d6
| 527568 ||  || — || October 20, 2007 || Mount Lemmon || Mount Lemmon Survey ||  || align=right | 2.1 km || 
|-id=569 bgcolor=#d6d6d6
| 527569 ||  || — || November 9, 2007 || Kitt Peak || Spacewatch ||  || align=right | 2.7 km || 
|-id=570 bgcolor=#d6d6d6
| 527570 ||  || — || November 9, 2007 || Kitt Peak || Spacewatch || LIX || align=right | 2.9 km || 
|-id=571 bgcolor=#fefefe
| 527571 ||  || — || November 9, 2007 || Kitt Peak || Spacewatch ||  || align=right data-sort-value="0.58" | 580 m || 
|-id=572 bgcolor=#d6d6d6
| 527572 ||  || — || October 16, 2007 || Kitt Peak || Spacewatch ||  || align=right | 2.2 km || 
|-id=573 bgcolor=#fefefe
| 527573 ||  || — || November 4, 2007 || Kitt Peak || Spacewatch || H || align=right data-sort-value="0.57" | 570 m || 
|-id=574 bgcolor=#d6d6d6
| 527574 ||  || — || October 30, 2007 || Mount Lemmon || Mount Lemmon Survey ||  || align=right | 2.6 km || 
|-id=575 bgcolor=#fefefe
| 527575 ||  || — || November 7, 2007 || Kitt Peak || Spacewatch ||  || align=right data-sort-value="0.61" | 610 m || 
|-id=576 bgcolor=#fefefe
| 527576 ||  || — || September 17, 2003 || Kitt Peak || Spacewatch ||  || align=right data-sort-value="0.57" | 570 m || 
|-id=577 bgcolor=#fefefe
| 527577 ||  || — || November 7, 2007 || Kitt Peak || Spacewatch ||  || align=right data-sort-value="0.58" | 580 m || 
|-id=578 bgcolor=#fefefe
| 527578 ||  || — || November 7, 2007 || Kitt Peak || Spacewatch ||  || align=right data-sort-value="0.59" | 590 m || 
|-id=579 bgcolor=#d6d6d6
| 527579 ||  || — || November 9, 2007 || Kitt Peak || Spacewatch ||  || align=right | 1.8 km || 
|-id=580 bgcolor=#fefefe
| 527580 ||  || — || October 15, 2007 || Kitt Peak || Spacewatch ||  || align=right data-sort-value="0.61" | 610 m || 
|-id=581 bgcolor=#fefefe
| 527581 ||  || — || October 30, 2007 || Kitt Peak || Spacewatch ||  || align=right data-sort-value="0.54" | 540 m || 
|-id=582 bgcolor=#fefefe
| 527582 ||  || — || October 9, 2007 || Kitt Peak || Spacewatch || NYS || align=right data-sort-value="0.55" | 550 m || 
|-id=583 bgcolor=#fefefe
| 527583 ||  || — || November 5, 2007 || Kitt Peak || Spacewatch ||  || align=right data-sort-value="0.64" | 640 m || 
|-id=584 bgcolor=#E9E9E9
| 527584 ||  || — || October 8, 2007 || Mount Lemmon || Mount Lemmon Survey ||  || align=right | 1.8 km || 
|-id=585 bgcolor=#d6d6d6
| 527585 ||  || — || October 9, 2007 || Mount Lemmon || Mount Lemmon Survey ||  || align=right | 2.2 km || 
|-id=586 bgcolor=#d6d6d6
| 527586 ||  || — || October 7, 2007 || Catalina || CSS || TIR || align=right | 3.2 km || 
|-id=587 bgcolor=#fefefe
| 527587 ||  || — || October 21, 2007 || Catalina || CSS ||  || align=right data-sort-value="0.70" | 700 m || 
|-id=588 bgcolor=#d6d6d6
| 527588 ||  || — || September 19, 2006 || Kitt Peak || Spacewatch ||  || align=right | 2.3 km || 
|-id=589 bgcolor=#d6d6d6
| 527589 ||  || — || November 9, 2007 || Kitt Peak || Spacewatch ||  || align=right | 3.0 km || 
|-id=590 bgcolor=#d6d6d6
| 527590 ||  || — || November 8, 2007 || Kitt Peak || Spacewatch ||  || align=right | 2.4 km || 
|-id=591 bgcolor=#d6d6d6
| 527591 ||  || — || October 20, 2007 || Catalina || CSS ||  || align=right | 3.2 km || 
|-id=592 bgcolor=#fefefe
| 527592 ||  || — || September 9, 2007 || Mount Lemmon || Mount Lemmon Survey ||  || align=right data-sort-value="0.51" | 510 m || 
|-id=593 bgcolor=#d6d6d6
| 527593 ||  || — || October 10, 2007 || Kitt Peak || Spacewatch ||  || align=right | 2.8 km || 
|-id=594 bgcolor=#d6d6d6
| 527594 ||  || — || November 3, 2007 || Kitt Peak || Spacewatch || KOR || align=right | 1.1 km || 
|-id=595 bgcolor=#fefefe
| 527595 ||  || — || November 5, 2007 || Kitt Peak || Spacewatch || NYS || align=right data-sort-value="0.58" | 580 m || 
|-id=596 bgcolor=#d6d6d6
| 527596 ||  || — || November 5, 2007 || Kitt Peak || Spacewatch ||  || align=right | 1.8 km || 
|-id=597 bgcolor=#d6d6d6
| 527597 ||  || — || November 14, 2007 || Kitt Peak || Spacewatch ||  || align=right | 2.9 km || 
|-id=598 bgcolor=#d6d6d6
| 527598 ||  || — || November 2, 2007 || Kitt Peak || Spacewatch ||  || align=right | 2.7 km || 
|-id=599 bgcolor=#d6d6d6
| 527599 ||  || — || November 14, 2007 || Kitt Peak || Spacewatch ||  || align=right | 2.0 km || 
|-id=600 bgcolor=#d6d6d6
| 527600 ||  || — || November 11, 2007 || Catalina || CSS ||  || align=right | 2.8 km || 
|}

527601–527700 

|-bgcolor=#FA8072
| 527601 ||  || — || October 8, 2007 || Anderson Mesa || LONEOS ||  || align=right data-sort-value="0.62" | 620 m || 
|-id=602 bgcolor=#d6d6d6
| 527602 ||  || — || October 10, 2007 || Catalina || CSS ||  || align=right | 2.8 km || 
|-id=603 bgcolor=#C2E0FF
| 527603 ||  || — || November 4, 2007 || Apache Point || A. C. Becker, A. W. Puckett, J. Kubica || SDO || align=right | 187 km || 
|-id=604 bgcolor=#C7FF8F
| 527604 ||  || — || November 4, 2007 || Apache Point || A. C. Becker, A. W. Puckett, J. Kubica || NT || align=right | 104 km || 
|-id=605 bgcolor=#d6d6d6
| 527605 ||  || — || November 6, 2007 || Kitt Peak || Spacewatch ||  || align=right | 3.2 km || 
|-id=606 bgcolor=#fefefe
| 527606 ||  || — || November 1, 2007 || Kitt Peak || Spacewatch ||  || align=right data-sort-value="0.72" | 720 m || 
|-id=607 bgcolor=#fefefe
| 527607 ||  || — || November 12, 2007 || Mount Lemmon || Mount Lemmon Survey || H || align=right data-sort-value="0.96" | 960 m || 
|-id=608 bgcolor=#d6d6d6
| 527608 ||  || — || November 1, 2007 || Kitt Peak || Spacewatch ||  || align=right | 3.2 km || 
|-id=609 bgcolor=#d6d6d6
| 527609 ||  || — || November 9, 2007 || Kitt Peak || Spacewatch ||  || align=right | 2.4 km || 
|-id=610 bgcolor=#d6d6d6
| 527610 ||  || — || November 2, 2007 || Kitt Peak || Spacewatch ||  || align=right | 2.2 km || 
|-id=611 bgcolor=#fefefe
| 527611 ||  || — || November 11, 2007 || Mount Lemmon || Mount Lemmon Survey ||  || align=right data-sort-value="0.70" | 700 m || 
|-id=612 bgcolor=#fefefe
| 527612 ||  || — || November 7, 2007 || Kitt Peak || Spacewatch || NYS || align=right data-sort-value="0.40" | 400 m || 
|-id=613 bgcolor=#d6d6d6
| 527613 ||  || — || November 1, 2007 || Kitt Peak || Spacewatch ||  || align=right | 2.0 km || 
|-id=614 bgcolor=#fefefe
| 527614 ||  || — || November 3, 2007 || Kitt Peak || Spacewatch ||  || align=right data-sort-value="0.54" | 540 m || 
|-id=615 bgcolor=#d6d6d6
| 527615 ||  || — || November 9, 2007 || Kitt Peak || Spacewatch ||  || align=right | 2.1 km || 
|-id=616 bgcolor=#d6d6d6
| 527616 ||  || — || November 11, 2007 || Mount Lemmon || Mount Lemmon Survey || 7:4 || align=right | 3.5 km || 
|-id=617 bgcolor=#fefefe
| 527617 ||  || — || November 2, 2007 || Catalina || CSS ||  || align=right data-sort-value="0.67" | 670 m || 
|-id=618 bgcolor=#d6d6d6
| 527618 ||  || — || November 8, 2007 || Catalina || CSS ||  || align=right | 3.4 km || 
|-id=619 bgcolor=#d6d6d6
| 527619 ||  || — || November 11, 2007 || Catalina || CSS ||  || align=right | 2.7 km || 
|-id=620 bgcolor=#fefefe
| 527620 ||  || — || November 4, 2007 || Kitt Peak || Spacewatch ||  || align=right data-sort-value="0.67" | 670 m || 
|-id=621 bgcolor=#d6d6d6
| 527621 ||  || — || November 8, 2007 || Catalina || CSS || EUP || align=right | 4.1 km || 
|-id=622 bgcolor=#fefefe
| 527622 ||  || — || October 10, 2007 || Mount Lemmon || Mount Lemmon Survey ||  || align=right data-sort-value="0.57" | 570 m || 
|-id=623 bgcolor=#d6d6d6
| 527623 ||  || — || November 6, 2007 || Kitt Peak || Spacewatch ||  || align=right | 3.4 km || 
|-id=624 bgcolor=#d6d6d6
| 527624 ||  || — || November 11, 2007 || Mount Lemmon || Mount Lemmon Survey ||  || align=right | 2.5 km || 
|-id=625 bgcolor=#d6d6d6
| 527625 ||  || — || November 4, 2007 || Mount Lemmon || Mount Lemmon Survey ||  || align=right | 2.7 km || 
|-id=626 bgcolor=#d6d6d6
| 527626 ||  || — || November 8, 2007 || Catalina || CSS ||  || align=right | 3.5 km || 
|-id=627 bgcolor=#fefefe
| 527627 ||  || — || September 21, 2003 || Kitt Peak || Spacewatch ||  || align=right data-sort-value="0.88" | 880 m || 
|-id=628 bgcolor=#d6d6d6
| 527628 ||  || — || November 4, 2007 || Kitt Peak || Spacewatch ||  || align=right | 2.5 km || 
|-id=629 bgcolor=#d6d6d6
| 527629 ||  || — || November 4, 2007 || Kitt Peak || Spacewatch ||  || align=right | 2.1 km || 
|-id=630 bgcolor=#d6d6d6
| 527630 ||  || — || November 7, 2007 || Kitt Peak || Spacewatch ||  || align=right | 2.2 km || 
|-id=631 bgcolor=#fefefe
| 527631 ||  || — || November 9, 2007 || Kitt Peak || Spacewatch ||  || align=right data-sort-value="0.64" | 640 m || 
|-id=632 bgcolor=#d6d6d6
| 527632 ||  || — || November 9, 2007 || Kitt Peak || Spacewatch ||  || align=right | 2.7 km || 
|-id=633 bgcolor=#fefefe
| 527633 ||  || — || March 16, 2005 || Catalina || CSS ||  || align=right | 1.0 km || 
|-id=634 bgcolor=#fefefe
| 527634 ||  || — || November 9, 2007 || Mount Lemmon || Mount Lemmon Survey ||  || align=right data-sort-value="0.74" | 740 m || 
|-id=635 bgcolor=#d6d6d6
| 527635 ||  || — || November 14, 2007 || Kitt Peak || Spacewatch ||  || align=right | 2.0 km || 
|-id=636 bgcolor=#fefefe
| 527636 ||  || — || October 4, 2007 || Kitt Peak || Spacewatch ||  || align=right data-sort-value="0.47" | 470 m || 
|-id=637 bgcolor=#fefefe
| 527637 ||  || — || November 2, 2007 || Catalina || CSS || H || align=right data-sort-value="0.66" | 660 m || 
|-id=638 bgcolor=#fefefe
| 527638 ||  || — || November 2, 2007 || Mount Lemmon || Mount Lemmon Survey ||  || align=right data-sort-value="0.62" | 620 m || 
|-id=639 bgcolor=#fefefe
| 527639 ||  || — || November 2, 2007 || Catalina || CSS ||  || align=right data-sort-value="0.67" | 670 m || 
|-id=640 bgcolor=#d6d6d6
| 527640 ||  || — || November 4, 2007 || Mount Lemmon || Mount Lemmon Survey ||  || align=right | 2.4 km || 
|-id=641 bgcolor=#d6d6d6
| 527641 ||  || — || November 5, 2007 || Mount Lemmon || Mount Lemmon Survey || Tj (2.99) || align=right | 3.7 km || 
|-id=642 bgcolor=#d6d6d6
| 527642 ||  || — || November 7, 2007 || Mount Lemmon || Mount Lemmon Survey ||  || align=right | 3.3 km || 
|-id=643 bgcolor=#d6d6d6
| 527643 ||  || — || November 8, 2007 || Mount Lemmon || Mount Lemmon Survey ||  || align=right | 3.4 km || 
|-id=644 bgcolor=#fefefe
| 527644 ||  || — || November 9, 2007 || Mount Lemmon || Mount Lemmon Survey ||  || align=right data-sort-value="0.75" | 750 m || 
|-id=645 bgcolor=#d6d6d6
| 527645 ||  || — || November 9, 2007 || Mount Lemmon || Mount Lemmon Survey ||  || align=right | 2.1 km || 
|-id=646 bgcolor=#d6d6d6
| 527646 ||  || — || November 11, 2007 || Mount Lemmon || Mount Lemmon Survey ||  || align=right | 2.7 km || 
|-id=647 bgcolor=#d6d6d6
| 527647 ||  || — || November 11, 2007 || Mount Lemmon || Mount Lemmon Survey ||  || align=right | 3.4 km || 
|-id=648 bgcolor=#d6d6d6
| 527648 ||  || — || November 11, 2007 || Mount Lemmon || Mount Lemmon Survey ||  || align=right | 3.1 km || 
|-id=649 bgcolor=#d6d6d6
| 527649 ||  || — || November 13, 2007 || Mount Lemmon || Mount Lemmon Survey ||  || align=right | 2.4 km || 
|-id=650 bgcolor=#d6d6d6
| 527650 ||  || — || November 14, 2007 || Mount Lemmon || Mount Lemmon Survey ||  || align=right | 2.2 km || 
|-id=651 bgcolor=#fefefe
| 527651 ||  || — || November 14, 2007 || Mount Lemmon || Mount Lemmon Survey || H || align=right data-sort-value="0.76" | 760 m || 
|-id=652 bgcolor=#d6d6d6
| 527652 ||  || — || November 15, 2007 || Mount Lemmon || Mount Lemmon Survey ||  || align=right | 2.7 km || 
|-id=653 bgcolor=#d6d6d6
| 527653 ||  || — || November 16, 2007 || Charleston || ARO ||  || align=right | 2.3 km || 
|-id=654 bgcolor=#d6d6d6
| 527654 ||  || — || October 9, 2007 || Catalina || CSS ||  || align=right | 3.5 km || 
|-id=655 bgcolor=#d6d6d6
| 527655 ||  || — || November 18, 2007 || Bisei SG Center || BATTeRS ||  || align=right | 3.4 km || 
|-id=656 bgcolor=#fefefe
| 527656 ||  || — || November 17, 2007 || Socorro || LINEAR || H || align=right data-sort-value="0.47" | 470 m || 
|-id=657 bgcolor=#d6d6d6
| 527657 ||  || — || October 10, 2007 || Catalina || CSS || TIR || align=right | 2.7 km || 
|-id=658 bgcolor=#d6d6d6
| 527658 ||  || — || September 15, 2007 || Mount Lemmon || Mount Lemmon Survey ||  || align=right | 2.4 km || 
|-id=659 bgcolor=#d6d6d6
| 527659 ||  || — || November 17, 2007 || Kitt Peak || Spacewatch || HYG || align=right | 2.1 km || 
|-id=660 bgcolor=#fefefe
| 527660 ||  || — || October 10, 2007 || Kitt Peak || Spacewatch || MAS || align=right data-sort-value="0.58" | 580 m || 
|-id=661 bgcolor=#fefefe
| 527661 ||  || — || November 18, 2007 || Mount Lemmon || Mount Lemmon Survey ||  || align=right data-sort-value="0.75" | 750 m || 
|-id=662 bgcolor=#d6d6d6
| 527662 ||  || — || November 18, 2007 || Mount Lemmon || Mount Lemmon Survey || EOS || align=right | 2.0 km || 
|-id=663 bgcolor=#fefefe
| 527663 ||  || — || November 7, 2007 || Kitt Peak || Spacewatch ||  || align=right data-sort-value="0.79" | 790 m || 
|-id=664 bgcolor=#fefefe
| 527664 ||  || — || October 16, 2007 || Mount Lemmon || Mount Lemmon Survey ||  || align=right data-sort-value="0.68" | 680 m || 
|-id=665 bgcolor=#d6d6d6
| 527665 ||  || — || November 19, 2007 || Mount Lemmon || Mount Lemmon Survey || EUP || align=right | 3.3 km || 
|-id=666 bgcolor=#fefefe
| 527666 ||  || — || November 4, 2007 || Kitt Peak || Spacewatch ||  || align=right data-sort-value="0.74" | 740 m || 
|-id=667 bgcolor=#d6d6d6
| 527667 ||  || — || November 20, 2007 || Mount Lemmon || Mount Lemmon Survey ||  || align=right | 3.0 km || 
|-id=668 bgcolor=#d6d6d6
| 527668 ||  || — || November 8, 2007 || Catalina || CSS ||  || align=right | 2.7 km || 
|-id=669 bgcolor=#fefefe
| 527669 ||  || — || October 14, 2007 || Mount Lemmon || Mount Lemmon Survey ||  || align=right data-sort-value="0.50" | 500 m || 
|-id=670 bgcolor=#fefefe
| 527670 ||  || — || November 18, 2007 || Mount Lemmon || Mount Lemmon Survey ||  || align=right data-sort-value="0.64" | 640 m || 
|-id=671 bgcolor=#FFC2E0
| 527671 ||  || — || November 29, 2007 || Socorro || LINEAR || AMOcritical || align=right data-sort-value="0.54" | 540 m || 
|-id=672 bgcolor=#fefefe
| 527672 ||  || — || November 17, 2007 || Mount Lemmon || Mount Lemmon Survey || H || align=right data-sort-value="0.75" | 750 m || 
|-id=673 bgcolor=#fefefe
| 527673 ||  || — || November 18, 2007 || Socorro || LINEAR || H || align=right data-sort-value="0.93" | 930 m || 
|-id=674 bgcolor=#d6d6d6
| 527674 ||  || — || November 17, 2007 || Kitt Peak || Spacewatch ||  || align=right | 1.4 km || 
|-id=675 bgcolor=#d6d6d6
| 527675 ||  || — || November 16, 2007 || Mount Lemmon || Mount Lemmon Survey ||  || align=right | 3.5 km || 
|-id=676 bgcolor=#d6d6d6
| 527676 ||  || — || November 19, 2007 || Mount Lemmon || Mount Lemmon Survey ||  || align=right | 2.8 km || 
|-id=677 bgcolor=#d6d6d6
| 527677 ||  || — || November 19, 2007 || Mount Lemmon || Mount Lemmon Survey ||  || align=right | 2.5 km || 
|-id=678 bgcolor=#d6d6d6
| 527678 ||  || — || November 19, 2007 || Mount Lemmon || Mount Lemmon Survey ||  || align=right | 3.1 km || 
|-id=679 bgcolor=#d6d6d6
| 527679 ||  || — || November 8, 2007 || Kitt Peak || Spacewatch ||  || align=right | 3.3 km || 
|-id=680 bgcolor=#d6d6d6
| 527680 ||  || — || December 4, 2007 || Catalina || CSS ||  || align=right | 2.5 km || 
|-id=681 bgcolor=#d6d6d6
| 527681 ||  || — || November 3, 2007 || Mount Lemmon || Mount Lemmon Survey ||  || align=right | 2.6 km || 
|-id=682 bgcolor=#fefefe
| 527682 ||  || — || December 4, 2007 || Mount Lemmon || Mount Lemmon Survey ||  || align=right data-sort-value="0.66" | 660 m || 
|-id=683 bgcolor=#d6d6d6
| 527683 ||  || — || October 21, 2007 || Mount Lemmon || Mount Lemmon Survey ||  || align=right | 2.4 km || 
|-id=684 bgcolor=#fefefe
| 527684 ||  || — || November 4, 2007 || Kitt Peak || Spacewatch ||  || align=right data-sort-value="0.53" | 530 m || 
|-id=685 bgcolor=#d6d6d6
| 527685 ||  || — || September 14, 2007 || Mount Lemmon || Mount Lemmon Survey || THM || align=right | 2.2 km || 
|-id=686 bgcolor=#d6d6d6
| 527686 ||  || — || November 4, 2007 || Socorro || LINEAR ||  || align=right | 2.8 km || 
|-id=687 bgcolor=#d6d6d6
| 527687 ||  || — || November 13, 2007 || Kitt Peak || Spacewatch ||  || align=right | 2.2 km || 
|-id=688 bgcolor=#fefefe
| 527688 ||  || — || November 19, 2007 || Kitt Peak || Spacewatch ||  || align=right data-sort-value="0.57" | 570 m || 
|-id=689 bgcolor=#d6d6d6
| 527689 ||  || — || October 16, 2007 || Catalina || CSS ||  || align=right | 3.2 km || 
|-id=690 bgcolor=#fefefe
| 527690 ||  || — || December 6, 2007 || Kitt Peak || Spacewatch ||  || align=right data-sort-value="0.52" | 520 m || 
|-id=691 bgcolor=#d6d6d6
| 527691 ||  || — || December 5, 2007 || Catalina || CSS || Tj (2.97) || align=right | 3.4 km || 
|-id=692 bgcolor=#d6d6d6
| 527692 ||  || — || November 7, 2007 || Kitt Peak || Spacewatch ||  || align=right | 2.0 km || 
|-id=693 bgcolor=#fefefe
| 527693 ||  || — || December 15, 2007 || Kitt Peak || Spacewatch ||  || align=right data-sort-value="0.82" | 820 m || 
|-id=694 bgcolor=#d6d6d6
| 527694 ||  || — || December 15, 2007 || Kitt Peak || Spacewatch ||  || align=right | 3.4 km || 
|-id=695 bgcolor=#d6d6d6
| 527695 ||  || — || December 14, 2007 || Mount Lemmon || Mount Lemmon Survey ||  || align=right | 2.1 km || 
|-id=696 bgcolor=#d6d6d6
| 527696 ||  || — || December 4, 2007 || Mount Lemmon || Mount Lemmon Survey ||  || align=right | 2.4 km || 
|-id=697 bgcolor=#d6d6d6
| 527697 ||  || — || December 5, 2007 || Kitt Peak || Spacewatch ||  || align=right | 3.3 km || 
|-id=698 bgcolor=#d6d6d6
| 527698 ||  || — || September 11, 2001 || Socorro || LINEAR ||  || align=right | 4.2 km || 
|-id=699 bgcolor=#fefefe
| 527699 ||  || — || December 4, 2007 || Mount Lemmon || Mount Lemmon Survey ||  || align=right data-sort-value="0.60" | 600 m || 
|-id=700 bgcolor=#d6d6d6
| 527700 ||  || — || September 16, 2006 || Catalina || CSS ||  || align=right | 3.1 km || 
|}

527701–527800 

|-bgcolor=#d6d6d6
| 527701 ||  || — || November 8, 2007 || Kitt Peak || Spacewatch ||  || align=right | 2.2 km || 
|-id=702 bgcolor=#E9E9E9
| 527702 ||  || — || November 8, 2007 || Kitt Peak || Spacewatch ||  || align=right | 2.6 km || 
|-id=703 bgcolor=#d6d6d6
| 527703 ||  || — || November 9, 2007 || Mount Lemmon || Mount Lemmon Survey ||  || align=right | 2.1 km || 
|-id=704 bgcolor=#d6d6d6
| 527704 ||  || — || November 2, 2007 || Kitt Peak || Spacewatch ||  || align=right | 2.5 km || 
|-id=705 bgcolor=#fefefe
| 527705 ||  || — || December 5, 2007 || Kitt Peak || Spacewatch ||  || align=right data-sort-value="0.59" | 590 m || 
|-id=706 bgcolor=#d6d6d6
| 527706 ||  || — || September 19, 2006 || Kitt Peak || Spacewatch ||  || align=right | 2.1 km || 
|-id=707 bgcolor=#fefefe
| 527707 ||  || — || December 18, 2007 || Mount Lemmon || Mount Lemmon Survey ||  || align=right data-sort-value="0.67" | 670 m || 
|-id=708 bgcolor=#d6d6d6
| 527708 ||  || — || November 19, 2007 || Kitt Peak || Spacewatch ||  || align=right | 2.6 km || 
|-id=709 bgcolor=#d6d6d6
| 527709 ||  || — || September 12, 2007 || Mount Lemmon || Mount Lemmon Survey || Tj (2.97) || align=right | 4.4 km || 
|-id=710 bgcolor=#fefefe
| 527710 ||  || — || December 30, 2007 || Kitt Peak || Spacewatch || MAS || align=right data-sort-value="0.57" | 570 m || 
|-id=711 bgcolor=#d6d6d6
| 527711 ||  || — || December 20, 2007 || Kitt Peak || Spacewatch ||  || align=right | 3.2 km || 
|-id=712 bgcolor=#d6d6d6
| 527712 ||  || — || November 20, 2007 || Catalina || CSS ||  || align=right | 2.4 km || 
|-id=713 bgcolor=#d6d6d6
| 527713 ||  || — || December 31, 2007 || Catalina || CSS ||  || align=right | 2.5 km || 
|-id=714 bgcolor=#FA8072
| 527714 ||  || — || December 31, 2007 || Mount Lemmon || Mount Lemmon Survey ||  || align=right data-sort-value="0.43" | 430 m || 
|-id=715 bgcolor=#FFC2E0
| 527715 ||  || — || December 31, 2007 || Anderson Mesa || LONEOS || APOPHA || align=right data-sort-value="0.37" | 370 m || 
|-id=716 bgcolor=#d6d6d6
| 527716 ||  || — || December 31, 2007 || Kitt Peak || Spacewatch ||  || align=right | 2.2 km || 
|-id=717 bgcolor=#fefefe
| 527717 ||  || — || December 5, 2007 || Mount Lemmon || Mount Lemmon Survey ||  || align=right data-sort-value="0.89" | 890 m || 
|-id=718 bgcolor=#d6d6d6
| 527718 ||  || — || December 17, 2007 || Mount Lemmon || Mount Lemmon Survey ||  || align=right | 3.1 km || 
|-id=719 bgcolor=#d6d6d6
| 527719 ||  || — || December 30, 2007 || Kitt Peak || Spacewatch ||  || align=right | 2.2 km || 
|-id=720 bgcolor=#fefefe
| 527720 ||  || — || December 18, 2007 || Mount Lemmon || Mount Lemmon Survey ||  || align=right data-sort-value="0.60" | 600 m || 
|-id=721 bgcolor=#d6d6d6
| 527721 ||  || — || December 30, 2007 || Mount Lemmon || Mount Lemmon Survey ||  || align=right | 2.5 km || 
|-id=722 bgcolor=#d6d6d6
| 527722 ||  || — || December 31, 2007 || Kitt Peak || Spacewatch ||  || align=right | 2.9 km || 
|-id=723 bgcolor=#d6d6d6
| 527723 ||  || — || December 31, 2007 || Kitt Peak || Spacewatch ||  || align=right | 2.3 km || 
|-id=724 bgcolor=#d6d6d6
| 527724 ||  || — || December 31, 2007 || Kitt Peak || Spacewatch ||  || align=right | 2.6 km || 
|-id=725 bgcolor=#d6d6d6
| 527725 ||  || — || December 18, 2007 || Mount Lemmon || Mount Lemmon Survey ||  || align=right | 3.2 km || 
|-id=726 bgcolor=#d6d6d6
| 527726 ||  || — || December 19, 2007 || Mount Lemmon || Mount Lemmon Survey ||  || align=right | 3.2 km || 
|-id=727 bgcolor=#d6d6d6
| 527727 ||  || — || December 30, 2007 || Mount Lemmon || Mount Lemmon Survey ||  || align=right | 3.5 km || 
|-id=728 bgcolor=#d6d6d6
| 527728 ||  || — || December 16, 2007 || Mount Lemmon || Mount Lemmon Survey ||  || align=right | 2.0 km || 
|-id=729 bgcolor=#d6d6d6
| 527729 ||  || — || December 16, 2007 || Mount Lemmon || Mount Lemmon Survey ||  || align=right | 1.9 km || 
|-id=730 bgcolor=#fefefe
| 527730 ||  || — || December 17, 2007 || Kitt Peak || Spacewatch ||  || align=right data-sort-value="0.85" | 850 m || 
|-id=731 bgcolor=#d6d6d6
| 527731 ||  || — || December 17, 2007 || Mount Lemmon || Mount Lemmon Survey ||  || align=right | 1.8 km || 
|-id=732 bgcolor=#d6d6d6
| 527732 ||  || — || December 18, 2007 || Mount Lemmon || Mount Lemmon Survey ||  || align=right | 2.5 km || 
|-id=733 bgcolor=#d6d6d6
| 527733 ||  || — || December 18, 2007 || Mount Lemmon || Mount Lemmon Survey ||  || align=right | 2.5 km || 
|-id=734 bgcolor=#fefefe
| 527734 ||  || — || December 18, 2007 || Mount Lemmon || Mount Lemmon Survey ||  || align=right data-sort-value="0.63" | 630 m || 
|-id=735 bgcolor=#fefefe
| 527735 ||  || — || December 19, 2007 || Mount Lemmon || Mount Lemmon Survey || H || align=right data-sort-value="0.59" | 590 m || 
|-id=736 bgcolor=#d6d6d6
| 527736 ||  || — || December 19, 2007 || Mount Lemmon || Mount Lemmon Survey ||  || align=right | 2.7 km || 
|-id=737 bgcolor=#d6d6d6
| 527737 ||  || — || December 30, 2007 || Mount Lemmon || Mount Lemmon Survey ||  || align=right | 2.1 km || 
|-id=738 bgcolor=#d6d6d6
| 527738 ||  || — || December 30, 2007 || Mount Lemmon || Mount Lemmon Survey ||  || align=right | 2.9 km || 
|-id=739 bgcolor=#fefefe
| 527739 ||  || — || December 14, 2007 || Mount Lemmon || Mount Lemmon Survey ||  || align=right data-sort-value="0.77" | 770 m || 
|-id=740 bgcolor=#d6d6d6
| 527740 ||  || — || December 31, 2007 || Mount Lemmon || Mount Lemmon Survey ||  || align=right | 2.2 km || 
|-id=741 bgcolor=#fefefe
| 527741 ||  || — || January 9, 2008 || Eskridge || G. Hug ||  || align=right data-sort-value="0.57" | 570 m || 
|-id=742 bgcolor=#fefefe
| 527742 ||  || — || October 21, 2003 || Kitt Peak || Spacewatch ||  || align=right data-sort-value="0.49" | 490 m || 
|-id=743 bgcolor=#d6d6d6
| 527743 ||  || — || October 31, 2006 || Kitt Peak || Spacewatch ||  || align=right | 2.2 km || 
|-id=744 bgcolor=#d6d6d6
| 527744 ||  || — || January 10, 2008 || Mount Lemmon || Mount Lemmon Survey || EUP || align=right | 3.1 km || 
|-id=745 bgcolor=#d6d6d6
| 527745 ||  || — || January 10, 2008 || Mount Lemmon || Mount Lemmon Survey ||  || align=right | 2.6 km || 
|-id=746 bgcolor=#d6d6d6
| 527746 ||  || — || January 10, 2008 || Mount Lemmon || Mount Lemmon Survey ||  || align=right | 2.7 km || 
|-id=747 bgcolor=#fefefe
| 527747 ||  || — || December 15, 2007 || Mount Lemmon || Mount Lemmon Survey || NYS || align=right data-sort-value="0.46" | 460 m || 
|-id=748 bgcolor=#fefefe
| 527748 ||  || — || January 10, 2008 || Kitt Peak || Spacewatch || H || align=right data-sort-value="0.67" | 670 m || 
|-id=749 bgcolor=#fefefe
| 527749 ||  || — || December 30, 2007 || Kitt Peak || Spacewatch ||  || align=right data-sort-value="0.74" | 740 m || 
|-id=750 bgcolor=#d6d6d6
| 527750 ||  || — || December 30, 2007 || Mount Lemmon || Mount Lemmon Survey ||  || align=right | 2.9 km || 
|-id=751 bgcolor=#d6d6d6
| 527751 ||  || — || January 10, 2008 || Mount Lemmon || Mount Lemmon Survey || LIX || align=right | 3.0 km || 
|-id=752 bgcolor=#fefefe
| 527752 ||  || — || January 10, 2008 || Mount Lemmon || Mount Lemmon Survey ||  || align=right data-sort-value="0.71" | 710 m || 
|-id=753 bgcolor=#fefefe
| 527753 ||  || — || January 10, 2008 || Mount Lemmon || Mount Lemmon Survey ||  || align=right data-sort-value="0.64" | 640 m || 
|-id=754 bgcolor=#fefefe
| 527754 ||  || — || January 10, 2008 || Mount Lemmon || Mount Lemmon Survey || NYS || align=right data-sort-value="0.45" | 450 m || 
|-id=755 bgcolor=#d6d6d6
| 527755 ||  || — || January 10, 2008 || Mount Lemmon || Mount Lemmon Survey ||  || align=right | 2.4 km || 
|-id=756 bgcolor=#d6d6d6
| 527756 ||  || — || January 7, 2008 || La Sagra || OAM Obs. ||  || align=right | 2.9 km || 
|-id=757 bgcolor=#d6d6d6
| 527757 ||  || — || December 30, 2007 || Mount Lemmon || Mount Lemmon Survey ||  || align=right | 2.0 km || 
|-id=758 bgcolor=#d6d6d6
| 527758 ||  || — || December 14, 2007 || Mount Lemmon || Mount Lemmon Survey ||  || align=right | 2.2 km || 
|-id=759 bgcolor=#d6d6d6
| 527759 ||  || — || December 18, 2007 || Mount Lemmon || Mount Lemmon Survey ||  || align=right | 4.4 km || 
|-id=760 bgcolor=#fefefe
| 527760 ||  || — || January 10, 2008 || Kitt Peak || Spacewatch ||  || align=right data-sort-value="0.86" | 860 m || 
|-id=761 bgcolor=#fefefe
| 527761 ||  || — || December 20, 2007 || Kitt Peak || Spacewatch ||  || align=right data-sort-value="0.65" | 650 m || 
|-id=762 bgcolor=#fefefe
| 527762 ||  || — || January 11, 2008 || Kitt Peak || Spacewatch || NYS || align=right data-sort-value="0.58" | 580 m || 
|-id=763 bgcolor=#d6d6d6
| 527763 ||  || — || December 3, 2007 || Kitt Peak || Spacewatch ||  || align=right | 2.4 km || 
|-id=764 bgcolor=#d6d6d6
| 527764 ||  || — || January 1, 2008 || Kitt Peak || Spacewatch ||  || align=right | 2.1 km || 
|-id=765 bgcolor=#d6d6d6
| 527765 ||  || — || January 11, 2008 || Kitt Peak || Spacewatch ||  || align=right | 2.7 km || 
|-id=766 bgcolor=#fefefe
| 527766 ||  || — || January 11, 2008 || Kitt Peak || Spacewatch ||  || align=right data-sort-value="0.63" | 630 m || 
|-id=767 bgcolor=#fefefe
| 527767 ||  || — || January 11, 2008 || Kitt Peak || Spacewatch ||  || align=right data-sort-value="0.58" | 580 m || 
|-id=768 bgcolor=#fefefe
| 527768 ||  || — || May 12, 2005 || Mount Lemmon || Mount Lemmon Survey || NYS || align=right data-sort-value="0.54" | 540 m || 
|-id=769 bgcolor=#d6d6d6
| 527769 ||  || — || January 11, 2008 || Kitt Peak || Spacewatch ||  || align=right | 2.3 km || 
|-id=770 bgcolor=#fefefe
| 527770 ||  || — || January 11, 2008 || Kitt Peak || Spacewatch || NYS || align=right data-sort-value="0.56" | 560 m || 
|-id=771 bgcolor=#fefefe
| 527771 ||  || — || January 11, 2008 || Kitt Peak || Spacewatch ||  || align=right data-sort-value="0.64" | 640 m || 
|-id=772 bgcolor=#d6d6d6
| 527772 ||  || — || November 18, 2007 || Mount Lemmon || Mount Lemmon Survey ||  || align=right | 2.4 km || 
|-id=773 bgcolor=#d6d6d6
| 527773 ||  || — || January 11, 2008 || Mount Lemmon || Mount Lemmon Survey ||  || align=right | 1.9 km || 
|-id=774 bgcolor=#d6d6d6
| 527774 ||  || — || December 14, 2007 || Mount Lemmon || Mount Lemmon Survey ||  || align=right | 2.4 km || 
|-id=775 bgcolor=#fefefe
| 527775 ||  || — || January 10, 2008 || Kitt Peak || Spacewatch ||  || align=right | 1.9 km || 
|-id=776 bgcolor=#d6d6d6
| 527776 ||  || — || January 11, 2008 || Mount Lemmon || Mount Lemmon Survey ||  || align=right | 2.5 km || 
|-id=777 bgcolor=#fefefe
| 527777 ||  || — || January 12, 2008 || Kitt Peak || Spacewatch ||  || align=right data-sort-value="0.57" | 570 m || 
|-id=778 bgcolor=#d6d6d6
| 527778 ||  || — || January 13, 2008 || Mount Lemmon || Mount Lemmon Survey ||  || align=right | 2.1 km || 
|-id=779 bgcolor=#fefefe
| 527779 ||  || — || December 30, 2007 || Kitt Peak || Spacewatch || NYS || align=right data-sort-value="0.49" | 490 m || 
|-id=780 bgcolor=#d6d6d6
| 527780 ||  || — || December 30, 2007 || Kitt Peak || Spacewatch ||  || align=right | 3.4 km || 
|-id=781 bgcolor=#d6d6d6
| 527781 ||  || — || November 7, 2007 || Mount Lemmon || Mount Lemmon Survey ||  || align=right | 2.8 km || 
|-id=782 bgcolor=#d6d6d6
| 527782 ||  || — || December 16, 2007 || Mount Lemmon || Mount Lemmon Survey ||  || align=right | 2.4 km || 
|-id=783 bgcolor=#d6d6d6
| 527783 ||  || — || January 1, 2008 || Kitt Peak || Spacewatch ||  || align=right | 2.5 km || 
|-id=784 bgcolor=#fefefe
| 527784 ||  || — || January 14, 2008 || Kitt Peak || Spacewatch ||  || align=right data-sort-value="0.83" | 830 m || 
|-id=785 bgcolor=#fefefe
| 527785 ||  || — || January 13, 2008 || Kitt Peak || Spacewatch ||  || align=right data-sort-value="0.72" | 720 m || 
|-id=786 bgcolor=#fefefe
| 527786 ||  || — || November 11, 2007 || Mount Lemmon || Mount Lemmon Survey ||  || align=right data-sort-value="0.76" | 760 m || 
|-id=787 bgcolor=#d6d6d6
| 527787 ||  || — || December 18, 2007 || Mount Lemmon || Mount Lemmon Survey ||  || align=right | 3.2 km || 
|-id=788 bgcolor=#d6d6d6
| 527788 ||  || — || December 5, 2007 || Kitt Peak || Spacewatch ||  || align=right | 2.4 km || 
|-id=789 bgcolor=#d6d6d6
| 527789 ||  || — || January 1, 2008 || Kitt Peak || Spacewatch ||  || align=right | 2.5 km || 
|-id=790 bgcolor=#d6d6d6
| 527790 ||  || — || December 31, 2007 || Mount Lemmon || Mount Lemmon Survey ||  || align=right | 2.0 km || 
|-id=791 bgcolor=#d6d6d6
| 527791 ||  || — || January 15, 2008 || Kitt Peak || Spacewatch ||  || align=right | 2.8 km || 
|-id=792 bgcolor=#E9E9E9
| 527792 ||  || — || May 24, 2001 || Kitt Peak || Spacewatch ||  || align=right | 2.5 km || 
|-id=793 bgcolor=#d6d6d6
| 527793 ||  || — || September 28, 2006 || Kitt Peak || Spacewatch ||  || align=right | 3.4 km || 
|-id=794 bgcolor=#d6d6d6
| 527794 ||  || — || January 14, 2008 || Kitt Peak || Spacewatch ||  || align=right | 2.3 km || 
|-id=795 bgcolor=#d6d6d6
| 527795 ||  || — || January 11, 2008 || Kitt Peak || Spacewatch ||  || align=right | 2.8 km || 
|-id=796 bgcolor=#d6d6d6
| 527796 ||  || — || January 11, 2008 || Mount Lemmon || Mount Lemmon Survey ||  || align=right | 3.2 km || 
|-id=797 bgcolor=#d6d6d6
| 527797 ||  || — || January 1, 2008 || Kitt Peak || Spacewatch ||  || align=right | 2.5 km || 
|-id=798 bgcolor=#fefefe
| 527798 ||  || — || January 11, 2008 || Catalina || CSS ||  || align=right | 2.1 km || 
|-id=799 bgcolor=#fefefe
| 527799 ||  || — || January 13, 2008 || Kitt Peak || Spacewatch ||  || align=right data-sort-value="0.98" | 980 m || 
|-id=800 bgcolor=#d6d6d6
| 527800 ||  || — || October 13, 2006 || Kitt Peak || Spacewatch ||  || align=right | 2.4 km || 
|}

527801–527900 

|-bgcolor=#d6d6d6
| 527801 ||  || — || January 10, 2008 || Kitt Peak || Spacewatch ||  || align=right | 2.4 km || 
|-id=802 bgcolor=#fefefe
| 527802 ||  || — || January 11, 2008 || Socorro || LINEAR ||  || align=right data-sort-value="0.81" | 810 m || 
|-id=803 bgcolor=#d6d6d6
| 527803 ||  || — || January 12, 2008 || Catalina || CSS || Tj (2.95) || align=right | 3.3 km || 
|-id=804 bgcolor=#d6d6d6
| 527804 ||  || — || January 10, 2008 || Kitt Peak || Spacewatch || THM || align=right | 2.0 km || 
|-id=805 bgcolor=#d6d6d6
| 527805 ||  || — || October 19, 2006 || Mount Lemmon || Mount Lemmon Survey ||  || align=right | 2.7 km || 
|-id=806 bgcolor=#fefefe
| 527806 ||  || — || January 1, 2008 || Kitt Peak || Spacewatch ||  || align=right data-sort-value="0.93" | 930 m || 
|-id=807 bgcolor=#d6d6d6
| 527807 ||  || — || October 2, 2006 || Kitt Peak || Spacewatch ||  || align=right | 2.4 km || 
|-id=808 bgcolor=#d6d6d6
| 527808 ||  || — || January 14, 2008 || Kitt Peak || Spacewatch ||  || align=right | 2.7 km || 
|-id=809 bgcolor=#d6d6d6
| 527809 ||  || — || January 10, 2008 || Mount Lemmon || Mount Lemmon Survey ||  || align=right | 1.9 km || 
|-id=810 bgcolor=#d6d6d6
| 527810 ||  || — || January 10, 2008 || Mount Lemmon || Mount Lemmon Survey ||  || align=right | 2.5 km || 
|-id=811 bgcolor=#d6d6d6
| 527811 ||  || — || January 11, 2008 || Mount Lemmon || Mount Lemmon Survey ||  || align=right | 3.4 km || 
|-id=812 bgcolor=#d6d6d6
| 527812 ||  || — || January 13, 2008 || Mount Lemmon || Mount Lemmon Survey ||  || align=right | 2.4 km || 
|-id=813 bgcolor=#fefefe
| 527813 ||  || — || December 31, 2007 || Kitt Peak || Spacewatch || H || align=right data-sort-value="0.69" | 690 m || 
|-id=814 bgcolor=#d6d6d6
| 527814 ||  || — || December 18, 2007 || Mount Lemmon || Mount Lemmon Survey ||  || align=right | 3.1 km || 
|-id=815 bgcolor=#fefefe
| 527815 ||  || — || January 16, 2008 || Kitt Peak || Spacewatch ||  || align=right data-sort-value="0.60" | 600 m || 
|-id=816 bgcolor=#d6d6d6
| 527816 ||  || — || January 18, 2008 || Kitt Peak || Spacewatch ||  || align=right | 2.1 km || 
|-id=817 bgcolor=#fefefe
| 527817 ||  || — || January 29, 2008 || La Sagra || OAM Obs. || H || align=right data-sort-value="0.72" | 720 m || 
|-id=818 bgcolor=#d6d6d6
| 527818 ||  || — || January 11, 2008 || Kitt Peak || Spacewatch ||  || align=right | 2.9 km || 
|-id=819 bgcolor=#fefefe
| 527819 ||  || — || January 30, 2008 || Mount Lemmon || Mount Lemmon Survey ||  || align=right data-sort-value="0.71" | 710 m || 
|-id=820 bgcolor=#E9E9E9
| 527820 ||  || — || January 30, 2008 || Kitt Peak || Spacewatch ||  || align=right | 1.7 km || 
|-id=821 bgcolor=#fefefe
| 527821 ||  || — || December 30, 2007 || Kitt Peak || Spacewatch ||  || align=right data-sort-value="0.77" | 770 m || 
|-id=822 bgcolor=#d6d6d6
| 527822 ||  || — || January 31, 2008 || Mount Lemmon || Mount Lemmon Survey ||  || align=right | 2.4 km || 
|-id=823 bgcolor=#d6d6d6
| 527823 ||  || — || November 21, 2007 || Mount Lemmon || Mount Lemmon Survey ||  || align=right | 2.1 km || 
|-id=824 bgcolor=#d6d6d6
| 527824 ||  || — || January 30, 2008 || Mount Lemmon || Mount Lemmon Survey ||  || align=right | 1.9 km || 
|-id=825 bgcolor=#fefefe
| 527825 ||  || — || January 31, 2008 || Mount Lemmon || Mount Lemmon Survey ||  || align=right data-sort-value="0.66" | 660 m || 
|-id=826 bgcolor=#d6d6d6
| 527826 ||  || — || January 31, 2008 || Mount Lemmon || Mount Lemmon Survey ||  || align=right | 2.5 km || 
|-id=827 bgcolor=#fefefe
| 527827 ||  || — || January 30, 2008 || Mount Lemmon || Mount Lemmon Survey || MAS || align=right data-sort-value="0.70" | 700 m || 
|-id=828 bgcolor=#d6d6d6
| 527828 ||  || — || January 19, 2008 || Kitt Peak || Spacewatch ||  || align=right | 2.6 km || 
|-id=829 bgcolor=#fefefe
| 527829 ||  || — || July 21, 2006 || Mount Lemmon || Mount Lemmon Survey ||  || align=right data-sort-value="0.69" | 690 m || 
|-id=830 bgcolor=#d6d6d6
| 527830 ||  || — || January 30, 2008 || Mount Lemmon || Mount Lemmon Survey ||  || align=right | 2.3 km || 
|-id=831 bgcolor=#d6d6d6
| 527831 ||  || — || January 30, 2008 || Mount Lemmon || Mount Lemmon Survey ||  || align=right | 2.0 km || 
|-id=832 bgcolor=#fefefe
| 527832 ||  || — || January 18, 2008 || Mount Lemmon || Mount Lemmon Survey ||  || align=right data-sort-value="0.91" | 910 m || 
|-id=833 bgcolor=#d6d6d6
| 527833 ||  || — || January 17, 2008 || Mount Lemmon || Mount Lemmon Survey ||  || align=right | 2.8 km || 
|-id=834 bgcolor=#d6d6d6
| 527834 ||  || — || January 19, 2008 || Mount Lemmon || Mount Lemmon Survey ||  || align=right | 2.2 km || 
|-id=835 bgcolor=#d6d6d6
| 527835 ||  || — || January 16, 2008 || Mount Lemmon || Mount Lemmon Survey ||  || align=right | 2.0 km || 
|-id=836 bgcolor=#d6d6d6
| 527836 ||  || — || January 16, 2008 || Mount Lemmon || Mount Lemmon Survey ||  || align=right | 2.6 km || 
|-id=837 bgcolor=#d6d6d6
| 527837 ||  || — || January 11, 2008 || Catalina || CSS ||  || align=right | 2.7 km || 
|-id=838 bgcolor=#d6d6d6
| 527838 ||  || — || January 19, 2008 || Mount Lemmon || Mount Lemmon Survey ||  || align=right | 2.8 km || 
|-id=839 bgcolor=#d6d6d6
| 527839 ||  || — || January 19, 2008 || Mount Lemmon || Mount Lemmon Survey ||  || align=right | 3.0 km || 
|-id=840 bgcolor=#fefefe
| 527840 ||  || — || January 30, 2008 || Mount Lemmon || Mount Lemmon Survey ||  || align=right data-sort-value="0.52" | 520 m || 
|-id=841 bgcolor=#FFC2E0
| 527841 ||  || — || February 3, 2008 || Catalina || CSS || APOcritical || align=right data-sort-value="0.43" | 430 m || 
|-id=842 bgcolor=#fefefe
| 527842 ||  || — || February 1, 2008 || Kitt Peak || Spacewatch ||  || align=right data-sort-value="0.56" | 560 m || 
|-id=843 bgcolor=#d6d6d6
| 527843 ||  || — || January 10, 2008 || Kitt Peak || Spacewatch ||  || align=right | 3.0 km || 
|-id=844 bgcolor=#fefefe
| 527844 ||  || — || February 3, 2008 || Kitt Peak || Spacewatch ||  || align=right data-sort-value="0.61" | 610 m || 
|-id=845 bgcolor=#fefefe
| 527845 ||  || — || February 3, 2008 || Kitt Peak || Spacewatch ||  || align=right data-sort-value="0.60" | 600 m || 
|-id=846 bgcolor=#fefefe
| 527846 ||  || — || February 3, 2008 || Kitt Peak || Spacewatch || H || align=right data-sort-value="0.68" | 680 m || 
|-id=847 bgcolor=#d6d6d6
| 527847 ||  || — || November 11, 2007 || Mount Lemmon || Mount Lemmon Survey ||  || align=right | 2.4 km || 
|-id=848 bgcolor=#d6d6d6
| 527848 ||  || — || February 3, 2008 || Kitt Peak || Spacewatch ||  || align=right | 2.3 km || 
|-id=849 bgcolor=#d6d6d6
| 527849 ||  || — || February 2, 2008 || Kitt Peak || Spacewatch ||  || align=right | 2.2 km || 
|-id=850 bgcolor=#fefefe
| 527850 ||  || — || December 31, 2007 || Kitt Peak || Spacewatch ||  || align=right data-sort-value="0.60" | 600 m || 
|-id=851 bgcolor=#fefefe
| 527851 ||  || — || January 16, 2008 || Kitt Peak || Spacewatch ||  || align=right data-sort-value="0.68" | 680 m || 
|-id=852 bgcolor=#d6d6d6
| 527852 ||  || — || February 2, 2008 || Kitt Peak || Spacewatch ||  || align=right | 2.8 km || 
|-id=853 bgcolor=#fefefe
| 527853 ||  || — || February 2, 2008 || Kitt Peak || Spacewatch || NYS || align=right data-sort-value="0.57" | 570 m || 
|-id=854 bgcolor=#d6d6d6
| 527854 ||  || — || December 15, 2006 || Kitt Peak || Spacewatch ||  || align=right | 3.0 km || 
|-id=855 bgcolor=#fefefe
| 527855 ||  || — || February 2, 2008 || Kitt Peak || Spacewatch ||  || align=right data-sort-value="0.72" | 720 m || 
|-id=856 bgcolor=#d6d6d6
| 527856 ||  || — || February 2, 2008 || Kitt Peak || Spacewatch ||  || align=right | 2.7 km || 
|-id=857 bgcolor=#d6d6d6
| 527857 ||  || — || November 18, 2007 || Mount Lemmon || Mount Lemmon Survey ||  || align=right | 2.8 km || 
|-id=858 bgcolor=#d6d6d6
| 527858 ||  || — || December 31, 2007 || Kitt Peak || Spacewatch ||  || align=right | 1.8 km || 
|-id=859 bgcolor=#d6d6d6
| 527859 ||  || — || February 7, 2008 || Mount Lemmon || Mount Lemmon Survey ||  || align=right | 2.3 km || 
|-id=860 bgcolor=#d6d6d6
| 527860 ||  || — || February 3, 2008 || Kitt Peak || Spacewatch ||  || align=right | 3.4 km || 
|-id=861 bgcolor=#fefefe
| 527861 ||  || — || February 7, 2008 || Mount Lemmon || Mount Lemmon Survey ||  || align=right data-sort-value="0.57" | 570 m || 
|-id=862 bgcolor=#d6d6d6
| 527862 ||  || — || January 14, 2008 || Kitt Peak || Spacewatch ||  || align=right | 2.5 km || 
|-id=863 bgcolor=#d6d6d6
| 527863 ||  || — || February 7, 2008 || Mount Lemmon || Mount Lemmon Survey ||  || align=right | 2.6 km || 
|-id=864 bgcolor=#fefefe
| 527864 ||  || — || February 8, 2008 || Kitt Peak || Spacewatch ||  || align=right data-sort-value="0.69" | 690 m || 
|-id=865 bgcolor=#fefefe
| 527865 ||  || — || February 8, 2008 || Mount Lemmon || Mount Lemmon Survey ||  || align=right data-sort-value="0.65" | 650 m || 
|-id=866 bgcolor=#fefefe
| 527866 ||  || — || April 27, 2001 || Kitt Peak || Spacewatch ||  || align=right data-sort-value="0.58" | 580 m || 
|-id=867 bgcolor=#d6d6d6
| 527867 ||  || — || January 13, 2008 || Catalina || CSS || EUP || align=right | 3.3 km || 
|-id=868 bgcolor=#d6d6d6
| 527868 ||  || — || February 10, 2008 || Catalina || CSS ||  || align=right | 2.9 km || 
|-id=869 bgcolor=#d6d6d6
| 527869 ||  || — || February 3, 2008 || Kitt Peak || Spacewatch || EUP || align=right | 4.2 km || 
|-id=870 bgcolor=#fefefe
| 527870 ||  || — || February 7, 2008 || Kitt Peak || Spacewatch || H || align=right data-sort-value="0.53" | 530 m || 
|-id=871 bgcolor=#d6d6d6
| 527871 ||  || — || February 7, 2008 || Kitt Peak || Spacewatch ||  || align=right | 4.3 km || 
|-id=872 bgcolor=#d6d6d6
| 527872 ||  || — || February 7, 2008 || Mount Lemmon || Mount Lemmon Survey ||  || align=right | 2.1 km || 
|-id=873 bgcolor=#d6d6d6
| 527873 ||  || — || December 5, 2007 || Mount Lemmon || Mount Lemmon Survey ||  || align=right | 2.2 km || 
|-id=874 bgcolor=#d6d6d6
| 527874 ||  || — || February 9, 2008 || Kitt Peak || Spacewatch ||  || align=right | 2.1 km || 
|-id=875 bgcolor=#d6d6d6
| 527875 ||  || — || February 9, 2008 || Kitt Peak || Spacewatch ||  || align=right | 2.4 km || 
|-id=876 bgcolor=#d6d6d6
| 527876 ||  || — || February 9, 2008 || Mount Lemmon || Mount Lemmon Survey ||  || align=right | 3.3 km || 
|-id=877 bgcolor=#d6d6d6
| 527877 ||  || — || January 15, 2008 || Mount Lemmon || Mount Lemmon Survey ||  || align=right | 2.5 km || 
|-id=878 bgcolor=#d6d6d6
| 527878 ||  || — || January 11, 2008 || Kitt Peak || Spacewatch ||  || align=right | 2.7 km || 
|-id=879 bgcolor=#d6d6d6
| 527879 ||  || — || December 17, 2007 || Kitt Peak || Spacewatch ||  || align=right | 2.2 km || 
|-id=880 bgcolor=#fefefe
| 527880 ||  || — || February 7, 2008 || Mount Lemmon || Mount Lemmon Survey || NYS || align=right data-sort-value="0.56" | 560 m || 
|-id=881 bgcolor=#fefefe
| 527881 ||  || — || February 7, 2008 || Mount Lemmon || Mount Lemmon Survey ||  || align=right data-sort-value="0.68" | 680 m || 
|-id=882 bgcolor=#fefefe
| 527882 ||  || — || February 8, 2008 || Kitt Peak || Spacewatch ||  || align=right data-sort-value="0.62" | 620 m || 
|-id=883 bgcolor=#fefefe
| 527883 ||  || — || February 8, 2008 || Kitt Peak || Spacewatch || MAS || align=right data-sort-value="0.50" | 500 m || 
|-id=884 bgcolor=#d6d6d6
| 527884 ||  || — || January 30, 2008 || Mount Lemmon || Mount Lemmon Survey ||  || align=right | 2.2 km || 
|-id=885 bgcolor=#fefefe
| 527885 ||  || — || February 8, 2008 || Kitt Peak || Spacewatch ||  || align=right data-sort-value="0.69" | 690 m || 
|-id=886 bgcolor=#d6d6d6
| 527886 ||  || — || February 8, 2008 || Mount Lemmon || Mount Lemmon Survey ||  || align=right | 2.1 km || 
|-id=887 bgcolor=#d6d6d6
| 527887 ||  || — || February 1, 2008 || Kitt Peak || Spacewatch ||  || align=right | 1.8 km || 
|-id=888 bgcolor=#fefefe
| 527888 ||  || — || February 8, 2008 || Kitt Peak || Spacewatch || MAS || align=right data-sort-value="0.62" | 620 m || 
|-id=889 bgcolor=#d6d6d6
| 527889 ||  || — || January 30, 2008 || Kitt Peak || Spacewatch || Tj (2.98) || align=right | 2.1 km || 
|-id=890 bgcolor=#d6d6d6
| 527890 ||  || — || January 11, 2008 || Mount Lemmon || Mount Lemmon Survey ||  || align=right | 2.6 km || 
|-id=891 bgcolor=#fefefe
| 527891 ||  || — || February 9, 2008 || Kitt Peak || Spacewatch ||  || align=right data-sort-value="0.61" | 610 m || 
|-id=892 bgcolor=#d6d6d6
| 527892 ||  || — || February 9, 2008 || Kitt Peak || Spacewatch ||  || align=right | 1.9 km || 
|-id=893 bgcolor=#fefefe
| 527893 ||  || — || February 9, 2008 || Kitt Peak || Spacewatch ||  || align=right data-sort-value="0.71" | 710 m || 
|-id=894 bgcolor=#E9E9E9
| 527894 ||  || — || February 9, 2008 || Kitt Peak || Spacewatch ||  || align=right data-sort-value="0.92" | 920 m || 
|-id=895 bgcolor=#d6d6d6
| 527895 ||  || — || February 9, 2008 || Catalina || CSS ||  || align=right | 3.6 km || 
|-id=896 bgcolor=#fefefe
| 527896 ||  || — || February 10, 2008 || Mount Lemmon || Mount Lemmon Survey ||  || align=right data-sort-value="0.82" | 820 m || 
|-id=897 bgcolor=#d6d6d6
| 527897 ||  || — || February 11, 2008 || Mount Lemmon || Mount Lemmon Survey ||  || align=right | 1.9 km || 
|-id=898 bgcolor=#d6d6d6
| 527898 ||  || — || February 12, 2008 || Kitt Peak || Spacewatch ||  || align=right | 3.8 km || 
|-id=899 bgcolor=#E9E9E9
| 527899 ||  || — || February 13, 2008 || Mount Lemmon || Mount Lemmon Survey ||  || align=right | 1.8 km || 
|-id=900 bgcolor=#d6d6d6
| 527900 ||  || — || November 22, 2006 || Kitt Peak || Spacewatch ||  || align=right | 2.5 km || 
|}

527901–528000 

|-bgcolor=#d6d6d6
| 527901 ||  || — || February 3, 2008 || Catalina || CSS ||  || align=right | 2.8 km || 
|-id=902 bgcolor=#d6d6d6
| 527902 ||  || — || February 8, 2008 || Kitt Peak || Spacewatch ||  || align=right | 1.8 km || 
|-id=903 bgcolor=#fefefe
| 527903 ||  || — || February 2, 2008 || Kitt Peak || Spacewatch || V || align=right data-sort-value="0.53" | 530 m || 
|-id=904 bgcolor=#d6d6d6
| 527904 ||  || — || February 8, 2008 || Kitt Peak || Spacewatch ||  || align=right | 2.0 km || 
|-id=905 bgcolor=#fefefe
| 527905 ||  || — || February 12, 2008 || Mount Lemmon || Mount Lemmon Survey || NYS || align=right data-sort-value="0.62" | 620 m || 
|-id=906 bgcolor=#d6d6d6
| 527906 ||  || — || February 12, 2008 || Mount Lemmon || Mount Lemmon Survey ||  || align=right | 1.9 km || 
|-id=907 bgcolor=#d6d6d6
| 527907 ||  || — || February 7, 2008 || Kitt Peak || Spacewatch ||  || align=right | 2.7 km || 
|-id=908 bgcolor=#fefefe
| 527908 ||  || — || February 9, 2008 || Kitt Peak || Spacewatch || NYS || align=right data-sort-value="0.57" | 570 m || 
|-id=909 bgcolor=#d6d6d6
| 527909 ||  || — || February 9, 2008 || Mount Lemmon || Mount Lemmon Survey ||  || align=right | 2.1 km || 
|-id=910 bgcolor=#fefefe
| 527910 ||  || — || February 13, 2008 || Kitt Peak || Spacewatch ||  || align=right data-sort-value="0.59" | 590 m || 
|-id=911 bgcolor=#fefefe
| 527911 ||  || — || February 2, 2008 || Kitt Peak || Spacewatch || MAS || align=right data-sort-value="0.53" | 530 m || 
|-id=912 bgcolor=#fefefe
| 527912 ||  || — || May 16, 2005 || Mount Lemmon || Mount Lemmon Survey ||  || align=right data-sort-value="0.85" | 850 m || 
|-id=913 bgcolor=#d6d6d6
| 527913 ||  || — || February 11, 2008 || Kitt Peak || Spacewatch ||  || align=right | 2.7 km || 
|-id=914 bgcolor=#fefefe
| 527914 ||  || — || February 7, 2008 || Mount Lemmon || Mount Lemmon Survey ||  || align=right data-sort-value="0.57" | 570 m || 
|-id=915 bgcolor=#d6d6d6
| 527915 ||  || — || February 10, 2008 || Kitt Peak || Spacewatch ||  || align=right | 2.7 km || 
|-id=916 bgcolor=#d6d6d6
| 527916 ||  || — || October 28, 2006 || Mount Lemmon || Mount Lemmon Survey ||  || align=right | 2.0 km || 
|-id=917 bgcolor=#fefefe
| 527917 ||  || — || February 8, 2008 || Kitt Peak || Spacewatch ||  || align=right | 1.1 km || 
|-id=918 bgcolor=#fefefe
| 527918 ||  || — || February 2, 2008 || Mount Lemmon || Mount Lemmon Survey ||  || align=right data-sort-value="0.83" | 830 m || 
|-id=919 bgcolor=#E9E9E9
| 527919 ||  || — || February 13, 2008 || Catalina || CSS ||  || align=right | 1.3 km || 
|-id=920 bgcolor=#d6d6d6
| 527920 ||  || — || January 15, 2008 || Mount Lemmon || Mount Lemmon Survey ||  || align=right | 3.1 km || 
|-id=921 bgcolor=#fefefe
| 527921 ||  || — || January 11, 2008 || Kitt Peak || Spacewatch ||  || align=right data-sort-value="0.79" | 790 m || 
|-id=922 bgcolor=#fefefe
| 527922 ||  || — || February 2, 2008 || Socorro || LINEAR || H || align=right data-sort-value="0.67" | 670 m || 
|-id=923 bgcolor=#d6d6d6
| 527923 ||  || — || February 24, 2008 || Mount Lemmon || Mount Lemmon Survey ||  || align=right | 2.3 km || 
|-id=924 bgcolor=#d6d6d6
| 527924 ||  || — || February 10, 2008 || Kitt Peak || Spacewatch ||  || align=right | 2.5 km || 
|-id=925 bgcolor=#d6d6d6
| 527925 ||  || — || January 12, 2008 || Kitt Peak || Spacewatch ||  || align=right | 2.2 km || 
|-id=926 bgcolor=#d6d6d6
| 527926 ||  || — || January 13, 2008 || Kitt Peak || Spacewatch ||  || align=right | 2.7 km || 
|-id=927 bgcolor=#d6d6d6
| 527927 ||  || — || January 14, 2008 || Kitt Peak || Spacewatch ||  || align=right | 2.2 km || 
|-id=928 bgcolor=#d6d6d6
| 527928 ||  || — || January 19, 2008 || Kitt Peak || Spacewatch ||  || align=right | 2.0 km || 
|-id=929 bgcolor=#d6d6d6
| 527929 ||  || — || November 18, 2007 || Kitt Peak || Spacewatch ||  || align=right | 3.0 km || 
|-id=930 bgcolor=#fefefe
| 527930 ||  || — || January 16, 2008 || Kitt Peak || Spacewatch ||  || align=right data-sort-value="0.74" | 740 m || 
|-id=931 bgcolor=#d6d6d6
| 527931 ||  || — || January 12, 2008 || Kitt Peak || Spacewatch ||  || align=right | 2.4 km || 
|-id=932 bgcolor=#d6d6d6
| 527932 ||  || — || February 27, 2008 || Kitt Peak || Spacewatch ||  || align=right | 2.7 km || 
|-id=933 bgcolor=#d6d6d6
| 527933 ||  || — || January 30, 2008 || Mount Lemmon || Mount Lemmon Survey ||  || align=right | 2.0 km || 
|-id=934 bgcolor=#fefefe
| 527934 ||  || — || February 18, 2008 || Mount Lemmon || Mount Lemmon Survey ||  || align=right data-sort-value="0.84" | 840 m || 
|-id=935 bgcolor=#d6d6d6
| 527935 ||  || — || February 29, 2008 || Catalina || CSS ||  || align=right | 3.7 km || 
|-id=936 bgcolor=#d6d6d6
| 527936 ||  || — || December 4, 2007 || Mount Lemmon || Mount Lemmon Survey ||  || align=right | 2.8 km || 
|-id=937 bgcolor=#d6d6d6
| 527937 ||  || — || January 14, 2008 || Kitt Peak || Spacewatch ||  || align=right | 2.3 km || 
|-id=938 bgcolor=#d6d6d6
| 527938 ||  || — || February 7, 2008 || Catalina || CSS ||  || align=right | 2.3 km || 
|-id=939 bgcolor=#fefefe
| 527939 ||  || — || February 14, 2008 || Mount Lemmon || Mount Lemmon Survey || H || align=right data-sort-value="0.52" | 520 m || 
|-id=940 bgcolor=#fefefe
| 527940 ||  || — || February 29, 2008 || Purple Mountain || PMO NEO || H || align=right data-sort-value="0.82" | 820 m || 
|-id=941 bgcolor=#fefefe
| 527941 ||  || — || January 30, 2008 || Mount Lemmon || Mount Lemmon Survey ||  || align=right data-sort-value="0.64" | 640 m || 
|-id=942 bgcolor=#d6d6d6
| 527942 ||  || — || February 26, 2008 || Mount Lemmon || Mount Lemmon Survey ||  || align=right | 1.9 km || 
|-id=943 bgcolor=#d6d6d6
| 527943 ||  || — || February 11, 2008 || Kitt Peak || Spacewatch || LIX || align=right | 3.5 km || 
|-id=944 bgcolor=#fefefe
| 527944 ||  || — || February 8, 2008 || Kitt Peak || Spacewatch ||  || align=right data-sort-value="0.59" | 590 m || 
|-id=945 bgcolor=#d6d6d6
| 527945 ||  || — || February 28, 2008 || Kitt Peak || Spacewatch ||  || align=right | 2.8 km || 
|-id=946 bgcolor=#d6d6d6
| 527946 ||  || — || February 18, 2008 || Mount Lemmon || Mount Lemmon Survey ||  || align=right | 2.3 km || 
|-id=947 bgcolor=#fefefe
| 527947 ||  || — || February 26, 2008 || Mount Lemmon || Mount Lemmon Survey ||  || align=right data-sort-value="0.76" | 760 m || 
|-id=948 bgcolor=#E9E9E9
| 527948 ||  || — || October 30, 2006 || Catalina || CSS ||  || align=right | 1.2 km || 
|-id=949 bgcolor=#fefefe
| 527949 ||  || — || March 6, 2008 || Mount Lemmon || Mount Lemmon Survey || H || align=right data-sort-value="0.54" | 540 m || 
|-id=950 bgcolor=#fefefe
| 527950 ||  || — || January 18, 2008 || Mount Lemmon || Mount Lemmon Survey ||  || align=right data-sort-value="0.73" | 730 m || 
|-id=951 bgcolor=#fefefe
| 527951 ||  || — || January 9, 2008 || Mount Lemmon || Mount Lemmon Survey ||  || align=right data-sort-value="0.80" | 800 m || 
|-id=952 bgcolor=#d6d6d6
| 527952 ||  || — || March 1, 2008 || Kitt Peak || Spacewatch ||  || align=right | 2.2 km || 
|-id=953 bgcolor=#fefefe
| 527953 ||  || — || February 10, 2008 || Kitt Peak || Spacewatch ||  || align=right data-sort-value="0.54" | 540 m || 
|-id=954 bgcolor=#fefefe
| 527954 ||  || — || March 1, 2008 || Kitt Peak || Spacewatch ||  || align=right data-sort-value="0.54" | 540 m || 
|-id=955 bgcolor=#fefefe
| 527955 ||  || — || March 1, 2008 || Kitt Peak || Spacewatch ||  || align=right data-sort-value="0.68" | 680 m || 
|-id=956 bgcolor=#d6d6d6
| 527956 ||  || — || February 13, 2008 || Mount Lemmon || Mount Lemmon Survey ||  || align=right | 2.0 km || 
|-id=957 bgcolor=#d6d6d6
| 527957 ||  || — || October 11, 2005 || Kitt Peak || Spacewatch ||  || align=right | 2.9 km || 
|-id=958 bgcolor=#E9E9E9
| 527958 ||  || — || February 8, 2008 || Kitt Peak || Spacewatch ||  || align=right | 2.1 km || 
|-id=959 bgcolor=#FFC2E0
| 527959 ||  || — || March 10, 2008 || Mount Lemmon || Mount Lemmon Survey || AMO || align=right data-sort-value="0.46" | 460 m || 
|-id=960 bgcolor=#d6d6d6
| 527960 ||  || — || January 1, 2008 || Kitt Peak || Spacewatch ||  || align=right | 2.1 km || 
|-id=961 bgcolor=#fefefe
| 527961 ||  || — || March 2, 2008 || Catalina || CSS ||  || align=right | 1.1 km || 
|-id=962 bgcolor=#d6d6d6
| 527962 ||  || — || March 4, 2008 || Kitt Peak || Spacewatch ||  || align=right | 2.5 km || 
|-id=963 bgcolor=#d6d6d6
| 527963 ||  || — || March 4, 2008 || Kitt Peak || Spacewatch ||  || align=right | 2.5 km || 
|-id=964 bgcolor=#d6d6d6
| 527964 ||  || — || March 4, 2008 || Kitt Peak || Spacewatch || TIR || align=right | 2.3 km || 
|-id=965 bgcolor=#d6d6d6
| 527965 ||  || — || March 5, 2008 || Mount Lemmon || Mount Lemmon Survey ||  || align=right | 3.1 km || 
|-id=966 bgcolor=#d6d6d6
| 527966 ||  || — || February 7, 2008 || Kitt Peak || Spacewatch ||  || align=right | 2.5 km || 
|-id=967 bgcolor=#d6d6d6
| 527967 ||  || — || March 6, 2008 || Mount Lemmon || Mount Lemmon Survey ||  || align=right | 2.5 km || 
|-id=968 bgcolor=#d6d6d6
| 527968 ||  || — || November 1, 2005 || Mount Lemmon || Mount Lemmon Survey ||  || align=right | 3.6 km || 
|-id=969 bgcolor=#fefefe
| 527969 ||  || — || March 7, 2008 || Mount Lemmon || Mount Lemmon Survey ||  || align=right data-sort-value="0.66" | 660 m || 
|-id=970 bgcolor=#d6d6d6
| 527970 ||  || — || February 8, 2008 || Kitt Peak || Spacewatch || EOS || align=right | 1.4 km || 
|-id=971 bgcolor=#fefefe
| 527971 ||  || — || March 7, 2008 || Mount Lemmon || Mount Lemmon Survey ||  || align=right data-sort-value="0.62" | 620 m || 
|-id=972 bgcolor=#d6d6d6
| 527972 ||  || — || February 13, 2008 || Mount Lemmon || Mount Lemmon Survey ||  || align=right | 3.1 km || 
|-id=973 bgcolor=#d6d6d6
| 527973 ||  || — || March 9, 2008 || Mount Lemmon || Mount Lemmon Survey ||  || align=right | 2.4 km || 
|-id=974 bgcolor=#fefefe
| 527974 ||  || — || March 9, 2008 || Mount Lemmon || Mount Lemmon Survey ||  || align=right data-sort-value="0.81" | 810 m || 
|-id=975 bgcolor=#d6d6d6
| 527975 ||  || — || October 27, 2005 || Kitt Peak || Spacewatch ||  || align=right | 2.3 km || 
|-id=976 bgcolor=#fefefe
| 527976 ||  || — || March 9, 2008 || Mount Lemmon || Mount Lemmon Survey || H || align=right data-sort-value="0.51" | 510 m || 
|-id=977 bgcolor=#FFC2E0
| 527977 ||  || — || March 11, 2008 || Socorro || LINEAR || ATEcritical || align=right data-sort-value="0.12" | 120 m || 
|-id=978 bgcolor=#d6d6d6
| 527978 ||  || — || February 11, 2008 || Mount Lemmon || Mount Lemmon Survey || LIX || align=right | 2.8 km || 
|-id=979 bgcolor=#d6d6d6
| 527979 ||  || — || February 28, 2008 || Kitt Peak || Spacewatch ||  || align=right | 2.7 km || 
|-id=980 bgcolor=#fefefe
| 527980 ||  || — || February 28, 2008 || Kitt Peak || Spacewatch || NYS || align=right data-sort-value="0.63" | 630 m || 
|-id=981 bgcolor=#fefefe
| 527981 ||  || — || February 28, 2008 || Kitt Peak || Spacewatch ||  || align=right data-sort-value="0.74" | 740 m || 
|-id=982 bgcolor=#d6d6d6
| 527982 ||  || — || February 2, 2008 || Kitt Peak || Spacewatch ||  || align=right | 2.7 km || 
|-id=983 bgcolor=#fefefe
| 527983 ||  || — || March 1, 2008 || Kitt Peak || Spacewatch ||  || align=right data-sort-value="0.76" | 760 m || 
|-id=984 bgcolor=#fefefe
| 527984 ||  || — || March 3, 2008 || Catalina || CSS || H || align=right data-sort-value="0.64" | 640 m || 
|-id=985 bgcolor=#fefefe
| 527985 ||  || — || February 26, 2008 || Mount Lemmon || Mount Lemmon Survey ||  || align=right data-sort-value="0.78" | 780 m || 
|-id=986 bgcolor=#d6d6d6
| 527986 ||  || — || March 11, 2008 || Mount Lemmon || Mount Lemmon Survey || 7:4 || align=right | 2.9 km || 
|-id=987 bgcolor=#d6d6d6
| 527987 ||  || — || February 8, 2008 || Kitt Peak || Spacewatch ||  || align=right | 2.1 km || 
|-id=988 bgcolor=#fefefe
| 527988 ||  || — || January 31, 2008 || Mount Lemmon || Mount Lemmon Survey ||  || align=right data-sort-value="0.63" | 630 m || 
|-id=989 bgcolor=#d6d6d6
| 527989 ||  || — || February 26, 2008 || Mount Lemmon || Mount Lemmon Survey || VER || align=right | 2.7 km || 
|-id=990 bgcolor=#d6d6d6
| 527990 ||  || — || March 1, 2008 || Kitt Peak || Spacewatch ||  || align=right | 1.9 km || 
|-id=991 bgcolor=#d6d6d6
| 527991 ||  || — || March 8, 2008 || Kitt Peak || Spacewatch ||  || align=right | 2.2 km || 
|-id=992 bgcolor=#E9E9E9
| 527992 ||  || — || March 8, 2008 || Kitt Peak || Spacewatch || KON || align=right | 2.4 km || 
|-id=993 bgcolor=#d6d6d6
| 527993 ||  || — || February 13, 2008 || Kitt Peak || Spacewatch || EOS || align=right | 1.3 km || 
|-id=994 bgcolor=#d6d6d6
| 527994 ||  || — || February 28, 2008 || Mount Lemmon || Mount Lemmon Survey ||  || align=right | 1.8 km || 
|-id=995 bgcolor=#d6d6d6
| 527995 ||  || — || March 1, 2008 || Kitt Peak || Spacewatch ||  || align=right | 2.6 km || 
|-id=996 bgcolor=#d6d6d6
| 527996 ||  || — || January 18, 2008 || Mount Lemmon || Mount Lemmon Survey ||  || align=right | 2.8 km || 
|-id=997 bgcolor=#fefefe
| 527997 ||  || — || March 10, 2008 || Kitt Peak || Spacewatch ||  || align=right data-sort-value="0.56" | 560 m || 
|-id=998 bgcolor=#fefefe
| 527998 ||  || — || March 10, 2008 || Kitt Peak || Spacewatch || H || align=right data-sort-value="0.70" | 700 m || 
|-id=999 bgcolor=#d6d6d6
| 527999 ||  || — || March 11, 2008 || Kitt Peak || Spacewatch ||  || align=right | 4.1 km || 
|-id=000 bgcolor=#d6d6d6
| 528000 ||  || — || February 2, 2008 || Mount Lemmon || Mount Lemmon Survey ||  || align=right | 2.2 km || 
|}

References

External links 
 Discovery Circumstances: Numbered Minor Planets (525001)–(530000) (IAU Minor Planet Center)

0527